= Heraclides =

Heraclides (/ˌhɛrəˈklaɪdiːz/; also rendered as Heracleides, Herakleides or Heraclid; Ancient Greek: Ἡρακλείδης, romanized: Hērakleídēs; Latin: Hēraclīdēs) was originally a patronymic borne by members of the legendary clan of the Heraclidae, the descendants of Heracles. As they were of the legendary tribe of the Dorians, the name in the classical age could mean anyone of Dorian background. The Dorians had their own group of dialects, which may or may not have been spoken by given individuals. Usage of the name was concentrated at Syracuse, a Dorian colony, Tarentum, a Spartan colony, and central Greece, legendary ancestral homeland of the Dorians, but they colonized the islands, Crete, and Anatolia as well. As a personal name, Heraclides may refer to:

== Political or military leaders and related ==
=== At Syracuse ===
Several political leaders from ancient Syracuse, Sicily

- Heracleides, son of Lysimachus, a Syracusan general during the siege of Syracuse in the Peloponnesian War 415 BC
- Heracleides, 414 BC, another Syracusan general in the Peloponnesian War 414 BC
- Heracleides, son of Aristogenes, a Syracusan admiral in the Peloponnesian War 409 BC
- Heracleides (admiral), admiral under Dionysius II of Syracuse and populist leader of Syracuse c. 357-355 BC
- Heracleides, 317 BC, a Syracusan leader who sustained Sosistratus in 317 BC
- Heracleides, uncle of Agathocles, an uncle of Agathocles of Syracuse
- Heracleides, 307 BC, the second son of Agathocles killed 307 BC

=== Elsewhere ===
- Heracleides Criticus, a Greek traveller of the 3rd century BC
- Heracleides of Leontini, a ruler or tyrant of Leontini 278 BC
- Heracleides of Mylasa, fl. 498 BC, a general from Mylasa, who commanded the Carian Greeks against the Persians 498 BC.
- Heracleides of Cyme, tyrant of Cyme in the 3rd century BC of uncertain name, usually accepted to be Heraclitus of Cyme
- Heraclides (son of Antiochus), general of Alexander the Great
- Heraclides (son of Argaeus), admiral of Alexander the Great
- Heracleides of Maroneia, a Greek in the service of the Thracian chief Seuthes c. 300 BC
- Heraclides, 290 BC, an officer of Demetrius Poliorcetes commanding the garrison of Athens
- Heracleides of Tarentum, an officer of Philip V of Macedon c. 213–199 BC
- Heracleides of Gyrton, a Thessalian cavalry commander in the army of Philip at the battle of Cynoscephalae
- Heracleides of Byzantium, an ambassador of Antiochus III the Great 190 BC
- Heracleides (ambassador), an envoy of Antiochus IV Epiphanes 169–162 BC
- Heraclides (bishop), a bishop of Ephesus
- Iacob Heraclid (1527–1563), soldier, Protestant missionary, and Prince of Moldavia

== Religion ==
- Saint Heraclides (died 202 AD), Egyptian Christian martyr

== Philosophy ==
- Heraclides of Tarentum (fl. 3rd – 2nd century BC) a Pyrrhonist philosopher and physician of the Empiric school
- Heraclides Ponticus (390–310 BC), philosopher and astronomer who suggested heliocentrism
- Heraclides of Aenus, one of Plato's students, with his brother Python in 358 BC he assassinated Cotys, king of Thrace
- Heraclides Lembus, a philosopher

== Literature ==
- Heracleides of Cyme fl. 350 BC, a little-attested historian
- Heracleides of Magnesia, author of a lost history of Mithridates VI of Pontus
- Heracleides of Odessus, a Greek historian mentioned by Stephanus Byzantinus
- Heraclides Ponticus the Younger, 1st century, Greek scholar who studied in Alexandria and worked in Rome (large passages from his works were published by Porphyry)
- Heracleides (rhetor), or Heracleides of Lycia, a Greek rhetorician of Lycia from the second century of our era. He was a disciple of Herodes Atticus, and taught in Athens and Smyrna
- Heracleides of Alexandria, Greek grammarian
- Heracleides of Sinope, a poet with one epigram in The Greek Anthology

== Fine arts ==
- Heraclides (painter) a Macedonian painter of ships and encaustic, c. 168 BC
- Heracleides (architect), an architect
- Heracleides of Ephesus, a sculptor, son of Agasias
- Heracleides the Phocian, a sculptor from Phocis

== Physicians ==
Several ancient physicians were named Heraclides:

- Heraclides (physician), son of Hippocrates I, married to Phaeniarete (or Praxithea), father of Sosander and Hippocrates II
- Heracleides Tarentinus, c. 2nd century BC, a physician of the Empiric school
- Heraclides of Erythrae 1st century BC, a physician of Erythrae in Ionia
- Heraclides of Smyrna 1st century BC, a follower of Hicesius, head of the Erasistratean school of medicine at Smyrna

== Modern people ==
- Heráclides César de Souza Araújo (1886–1962), Brazilian scientist
