= List of physicians named Apollonius =

Apollonius (Ancient Greek: Ἀπολλώνιος) was the name of several physicians in the time of Ancient Greece and Rome:

- Apollonius Antiochenus (or Apollonius of Antioch) was the name of two physicians, father and son, who were born at Antioch, and belonged to the Empiric school. They lived after Serapion of Alexandria, and before Menodotus, and therefore lived in the 2nd or 1st century BC. One of them is probably the physician called Apollonius Empiricus; the other may be Apollonius Senior.
- Apollonius Archistrator, was the author of a medical prescription quoted by Andromachus, and must therefore have lived in or before the 1st century BC. Nothing is known about the events of his life.
- Apollonius Biblas, lived probably in the 2nd century BC, and wrote, after Zeno's death, a book in answer to a work he composed on the meaning of certain marks (charakteres) that are found at the end of some chapters in the third book of the Epidemics of Hippocrates. It seems likely that he is not the same person as Apollonius Empiricus. His name is probably connected with the word bibliakos, and suggests that he was a "book worm".
- Apollonius Cittensis, (or Apollonius of Citium), 1st century BC, the oldest commentator on Hippocrates whose works are still extant. See Apollonius of Citium.
- Apollonius Claudius, must have lived in or before the 2nd century AD, as one of his antidotes is quoted by Galen. Nothing is known of his life.
- Apollonius Cyprius, (or Apollonius of Cyprus), was the pupil of Olympicus, and the tutor to Julianus. He was a native of Cyprus, belonged to the Methodic school, and probably lived in the 1st century AD. Nothing more is known of his life.
- Apollonius Empiricus, perhaps one of the physicians called Apollonius Antiochenus. He lived, according to Celsus, after Serapion of Alexandria, and before Heraclides of Tarentum, and therefore probably lived in the 2nd century BC. He belonged to the Empiric school, and like Apollonius Biblas, wrote a book in answer to Zeno's work on the marks (charakteres) in Hippocrates. This was answered by Zeno, and it was this second work that drew from Apollonius Biblas his treatise on the subject after Zeno's death. He is also mentioned by Galen.
- Apollonius Glaucus, must have lived in or before the 2nd century AD, as his work On Internal Diseases is quoted by Caelius Aurelianus. Nothing is known of his life.
- Apollonius Herophileius, is perhaps the same person as Apollonius Mus. He wrote a pharmaceutical work entitled Peri Euporiston, (Latin: De Facile Parabilibus), and of which some fragments are quoted in Cramer's Anecd. Graeca Paris, as still existing in manuscript in the Royal Library in Paris. He lived earlier than Andromachus who quotes him, and also before Archigenes; hence he may have lived in or before the 1st century BC. He was a follower of Herophilus, and is said by Galen to have lived for some time at Alexandria. His work, Peri Myron, On Ointments, is quoted by Athenaeus, and he is also mentioned by Caelius Aurelianus.
- Apollonius Hippocraticus, is said by Galen, to have been a pupil of Hippocrates, and must therefore have lived in the 4th century BC. He is blamed by Erasistratus for his excessive severity in restricting the quantity of drink allowed to his patients.
- Apollonius Memphites (or Apollonius of Memphis), was born at Memphis in Egypt, and was a follower of Erasistratus. He must therefore have lived around the 3rd century BC, and is probably the same person as Apollonius Stratonicus. He wrote a work On the Names of the Parts of the Human Body, and is quoted by Erotianus, Galen, Nicolaus Myrepsus, and other ancient writers.
- Apollonius Mus, a follower of Herophilus. Nothing is known about his life, but he must have lived in the 1st century BC, as Strabo mentions him as a contemporary. He was a fellow-pupil of Heraclides of Erythrae, and composed a long work on the opinions of the sect founded by Herophilus. He also wrote on pharmacy, and is perhaps the same person as Apollonius Herophileius.
- Apollonius Ophis, is said by Erotianus, to have made a compilation from the Glossary of difficult Hippocratic words by Bacchius; he must therefore have lived about the 2nd or 1st century BC. He may be the same person as Apollonius Pergamenus, or Apollonius Ther.
- Apollonius Organicus, is quote by Galen, and must therefore have lived in or before the 2nd century AD. Nothing is known of his life.
- Apollonius Pergamenus (or Apollonius of Pergamon), is perhaps the same person as Apollonius Ophis, or Apollonius Ther. He was born at Pergamon in Mysia, but his date is uncertain; he is quoted by Oribasius, and must have lived before the 4th century AD. He is probably the author of a long extract on Scarification preserved by Oribasius.
- Apollonius Pitaneus (or Apollonius of Pitane), was born at Pitane in Aeolia, and must have lived in to before the 1st century AD, as an absurd and superstitious remedy is attributed to him by Pliny.
- Apollonius Senior, is quoted by Erotianus, and must therefore have lived in or before the 1st century AD. He may be one of the physicians called Apollonius Antiochenus.
- Apollonius Stratonicus, was probably not the son, but the pupil, of Strato of Beryta. He is likely the same person as Apollonius Memphites, and may have lived about the 3rd century BC. He was a follower of Erasistratus, and wrote a work on the Pulse, which is quoted by Galen.
- Apollonius Tarensis (or Apollonius of Tarsus), was born at Tarsus in Cilicia, and lived perhaps in the 1st or 2nd century AD. His prescriptions are several times quoted by Galen.
- Apollonius Ther, is perhaps the same person as Apollonius Ophis or Apollonius Pergamenus. He is quoted by Erotianus, and must have lived in or before the 1st century AD.

Another physician of this name, who is mentioned by Apuleius, as having been bitten by a mad dog, must (if he ever really existed) have lived in the 2nd century AD. The name occurs in several ancient authors, belonging to one or more physicians, without any distinguishing epithet.
