= Zeuxis of Tarentum =

Ancient Greek Physician

Zeuxis of Tarentum (Ancient Greek: Zεῦξις), 3rd century BC, was a physician of the Empiric school, who wrote commentaries on the works of Hippocrates.

He was a native of Tarentum, one of the earliest commentators on the writings of Hippocrates, and also one of the earliest of the Empiric school. He lived after Herophilus, Callimachus, Bacchius, and Glaucias; and apparently before Zeno; and his date may therefore be placed around the middle of the 3rd century BC. He expounded the whole of the Hippocratic Collection, but his commentaries were not much esteemed in Galen's time, and had become scarce.
