= Epilogism =

Epilogism (ἐπίλογισμός; lit. "appraisal" or "assessment") is a theory-free method of inference used in Ancient Greek philosophy and Ancient Greek medicine in order to arrive at insight without deductive reasoning or inference based on unobservables, relying solely on reflection of what is already both visible and evident. It was used by Epicurus in his discussions of the philosophy of time, and also as a justification for his theory of psychological hedonism. In the Empiric school of medicine, it was one of the three main sources of knowledge, along with direct observation and the study of observations made by others.

== Epicurus ==
In his Letter to Herodotus, Epicurus introduces epilogism as a proof-free method of philosophical argumentation for comprehending the nature of time, which he did not consider to be an independently existing abstract object, and therefore did not believe could be studied through observation of the external world. Epicurus claimed that although we do not have a preconception of the nature time, we nonetheless speak of having "a lot of time" or "little time" and we can arrive at a better understanding of how we conceive of time falling into discrete periods by reflecting on what we mean when we say "a lot of time." Epicurus also argued in the Letter to Menoeceus that we can arrive at insight on the relations between pleasure and pain, desire, and happiness through an assessment of our own sense experience, preconceptions and feelings beyond what we already know from them alone.

== Empiric school of medicine ==
In the Empiric school of medicine, epilogism is one of the three sources or tripod of empiric medicine, along with personal observation and the study of observations collected by others. Menodotus of Nicomedia use of this notion was included in the extant Latin version of Galen's Subfiguratio empirica, where it was described as the third method in addition to perception and recollection. However, it is unclear whether Menodotus introduced this method to the Empiric school himself, or whether it was introduced by the earlier empiric physician Heraclides of Tarentum, who was an Epicurean.

For the empirics, epilogism was reasoning that focused on a temporarily hidden subject. It was employed as a method to uncover the provisionally hidden subjects, which are not entirely inaccessible to experience. It covered the ground addressed by the commemorative sign and featured the ordinary reasoning common to all human beings. It also had an exclusive focus on the phenomena and simply reported (without endorsing) the practice of the empirical doctor. As a medical method, it was used to infer the existence of something that is temporarily unclear, but in principle observable.

It is also said that the empirics devised epilogism to distinguish their kind of reasoning from the type used by the rationalists, which required an understanding of the underlying nature of things, including the link between consequence and exclusion drawn between states of affairs. Some also consider epilogism as the most extreme form of reasoning acceptable to the empirics.

== Modern reception ==
Epilogism is discussed in The Black Swan: The Impact of the Highly Improbable by Nassim Nicholas Taleb, as a way of viewing history through the accumulation of facts without major generalization and with consideration of the consequences of making causal claims.
