= Zeno (physician) =

Greek physician

Zeno (or Zenon, Koine Greek: Ζήνων; 3rd and 2nd centuries BC) was a Greek physician.

He was one of the most eminent of the followers of Herophilus, whom Galen calls "no ordinary man," and who is said by Diogenes Laërtius to have been better able to think than to write. He lived probably at the end of the 3rd and beginning of the 2nd centuries BC, as he was a contemporary of Apollonius Empiricus, with whom he carried on a controversy concerning the meaning of certain marks (Koine Greek: χαρακτῆρες) that are found at the end of some of the chapters of the third book of the Epidemics of Hippocrates. He gave particular attention to the materia medica, and is perhaps the physician whose medical formulae are quoted by Galen, in which case he must have been a native of Laodicea. He is mentioned in several other passages by Galen, and also by Erotianus; perhaps also by Pliny, Caelius Aurelianus, Alexander of Aphrodisias, and Rufus of Ephesus, but this is uncertain.
