= Mantias =

Mantias, (Greek: Μαντίας; 3rd century BC) a Greek physician who was the tutor of Heraclides of Tarentum, and one of the followers of Herophilus; and who lived therefore most probably in the 3rd century BC. Galen says that he was no ordinary physician, and that he was the first who wrote a regular work on pharmacy. His works on the subject, which are several times quoted by Galen, are lost, but the titles of some of them have been preserved.
