= Alpha Rho Chi =

American architecture fraternity

- ΑΡΧ
- Founded: April 11, 1914; 112 years ago Sherman House Hotel, Chicago, Illinois
- Type: Professional
- Affiliation: PFA
- Former affiliation: PIC
- Status: Active
- Emphasis: Architecture and the allied arts
- Scope: National
- Motto: Fidelitas, Amor et Artes; Fidelity and Love of the Arts
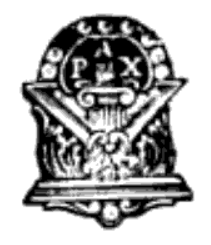
- Member badge
- Colors: Azure and Sanguine
- Flower: White Rose
- Publication: The Archi; The Alpha Rho Chi Letter
- Chapters: 30 collegiate chapters, 16 alumni associations
- Headquarters: 1217 86th Street; North Bergen, New Jersey 07047; United States
- Website: www.alpharhochi.org

Alpha Rho Chi (ΑΡΧ) is an American professional co-educational college fraternity for students studying architecture and related professions. The fraternity's name is derived from the first three letters of the Greek word for architecture, ἀρχιτεκτονική.

== History ==
=== Founding ===
APX was founded on April 11, 1914, with the merger of Sigma Upsilon (local) at the University of Michigan and the Arcus Society (local) at the University of Illinois to form a national fraternity for Architecture and the allied arts.

Sigma Upsilon (local) had been founded four years prior by eight architecture students at Michigan, with the intent of eventually forming a national architecture fraternity, and had drafted their constitution and laws to reflect that. Two years after they were founded in 1912. they were recognized by their school as a fraternity and started negotiations with other schools to open up more chapters.

In 1911, the Arcus Society (local) was formed by fifteen architecture students as a secret society; it became public a year later. After recognition by their school, the Arcus Society started correspondence with several other schools to expand. One of those schools was the University of Michigan, which started the collaboration of the two founding brothers of ΑΡΧ, Leo M. Bauer of the Arcus Society and Chandler C. Cohagen of Sigma Upsilon.

According to fraternity history books, the Anthemios chapter at the University of Illinois claims to be the first chapter of the new fraternity. This was achieved by setting the meeting for the fraternity's organization and merger while Illinois was on break and Michigan was still holding classes. Iktinos at Michigan also claims to be the first chapter as their precursor organization existed before the society in Illinois. Both the Iktinos and Anthemios chapters are considered the founding chapters and share the same cadency mark.

Bauer and Cohagen met on April 11, 1914, at the Hotel Sherman in Chicago, where they selected the name for the combined organization, the new constitution and by-laws, and the coat of arms. The brothers decided to keep the colors azure and sanguine, from the Arcus Society, and the white rose, a symbol of Sigma Upsilon. They also selected the chapter names from a list of prominent Greek and Roman architects; Egyptian architects were added at a later date. Illinois selected Anthemios as their name, and Michigan selected Iktinos.

=== Expansion to World War I ===
Alpha Rho Chi set expansion and becoming a national architecture fraternity as their first goal. Several existing architecture organizations petitioned to join, but only Tau Epsilon Chi of Ohio State University was accepted, being installed as the Demetrios chapter on February 25, 1916. The Cyma Club became the Mnesicles chapter at the University of Minnesota on October 10, 1916. Recruiting efforts slowed with the start of World War I because most of the brothers entered the armed services.

=== Great Depression and World War II ===
After the war, the Kallikrates chapter was installed at the University of Virginia on February 15, 1922. The Andronicus chapter was installed a month later, on March 11, 1922, with eleven charter members at the University of Southern California. Expansion continued at a rapid pace with the addition of members at Kansas State University, which formed the Paeonios chapter on February 10, 1923. Ten members of the Delta Club at the University of Texas at Austin were initiated on April 19, 1924, to form the Dinocrates chapter. The Polyklitos chapter at Carnegie Tech (now Carnegie-Mellon University) was established on May 24, 1924. With the addition of the Theron chapter at Oklahoma A&M (now Oklahoma State University) on May 23, 1926, the fraternity stood at ten active chapters and was truly national in stature.

The Great Depression and World War II affected the strength of the local chapters, and several failed to survive. Only six chapters returned–Anthemios, Iktinos, Demetrios, Mnesicles, Andronicus, and Kallikrates–with strong alumni support and renewed membership. In 1954, the Vitruvius charter was established at Pennsylvania State University and was installed as a chapter on March 27, 1955.

=== Post-war and further expansion ===
Next to be installed was a group from Arizona State University, which became the Satyros chapter on May 13, 1962. Two representatives from Virginia Polytechnic Institute (Virginia Tech) were initiated at the 31st National Convention; in turn, they assisted with the installation of the Metagenes chapter on March 23, 1969. With the addition of the Xenocles chapter at the University of Texas at Arlington on September 13, 1970, Alpha Rho Chi returned to its former high point of ten active chapters.

During the early 1970s, fraternity membership, in general, dropped as controversy raged on college campuses over the Vietnam War and any "establishment" organization. Alpha Rho Chi continued, installing the Cleisthenes chapter at the University of Houston on March 11, 1972. In the 1980s, college fraternities enjoyed a renaissance and Alpha Rho Chi added four new chapters. In June 1980, the Daedalus chapter was founded at the California Polytechnic State University to become the fraternity's second West Coast chapter. After an initiation night at the Anthemios chapter house, the Daphnis chapter of the University of Arkansas was installed on November 23, 1980. The Heracleides chapter of the University of Oklahoma was installed before a Texas-style bar-b-que at Xenocles chapter on September 6, 1981. After collecting the required ten members for initiation, the Rhoecus chapter was installed at the University of Kansas on April 8, 1984.

The Apollodorus charter was bussed for thirteen hours from the University of Florida to Metagenes chapter; they were officially installed as a chapter on April 10, 1986, in Gainesville, Florida. On March 29, 1992, Alpha Rho Chi installed the Pytheos chapter at the University of Nebraska. The Seshait chapter at Florida A&M University was installed on March 12, 1994, becoming the first chapter with an Egyptian namesake.

=== New millennium ===
The co-op program at the University of Cincinnati created a unique installation for the Rabirius chapter, whose members were initiated in two separate ceremonies; one held in Cincinnati on November 4, 2000, and the other on January 20, 2001. In September 2001, a professor began a correspondence with the fraternity in hopes of establishing a chapter at the University of Memphis. Up to this point, Alpha Rho Chi had limited expansion to accredited schools of architecture; however, after revisiting the fraternity's original objectives and mission, it was determined that there was no reason to exclude the University of Memphis. On October 19, 2002, the Imhotep chapter was installed in Champaign, Illinois.

Improved communications, including a website and email access, helped interested architecture students discover and contact the national fraternity, accelerating the pace of the expansion of new and reactivated chapters. Nicon chapter was established at Florida International University on July 11, 2004. In the Northeast, the Vitruvius chapter sponsored two new chapters simultaneously. Vitruvius installed the Domitian chapter at the New Jersey Institute of Technology on January 30, 2005, and the Senenmut chapter at the University at Buffalo on February 26, 2005. A charter at Tulane University was preparing its petition to establish a chapter when Hurricane Katrina struck New Orleans, closing the school for a semester and scattering the students across the country. After regrouping, the Hadrian chapter was finally installed on November 4, 2006.

Students at the California College of the Arts in San Francisco formed the Cossutius charter, and were installed at the Andronicus chapter house on January 20, 2008. Representatives from Andronicus, Daedalus, Satyros, Anthemios, Hadrian, and Vitruvius chapters were on hand to usher in the newest chapter.

=== Recent history ===
The Anthemios Alumni Association held a centennial celebration beginning in 2014. In 2014, the Olynthius chapter was installed at the University of Maryland. In the spring of 2017, Alpha Rho Chi welcomed two new chapters; the Theodorus chapter was established at the University of Tennessee-Knoxville in February and was followed by the Amenophis chapter at Southern Illinois University-Carbondale in April. Skopas chapter at Syracuse University is the most recent addition, installed in May 2021.

The fraternity's national headquarters is in North Bergen, New Jersey.

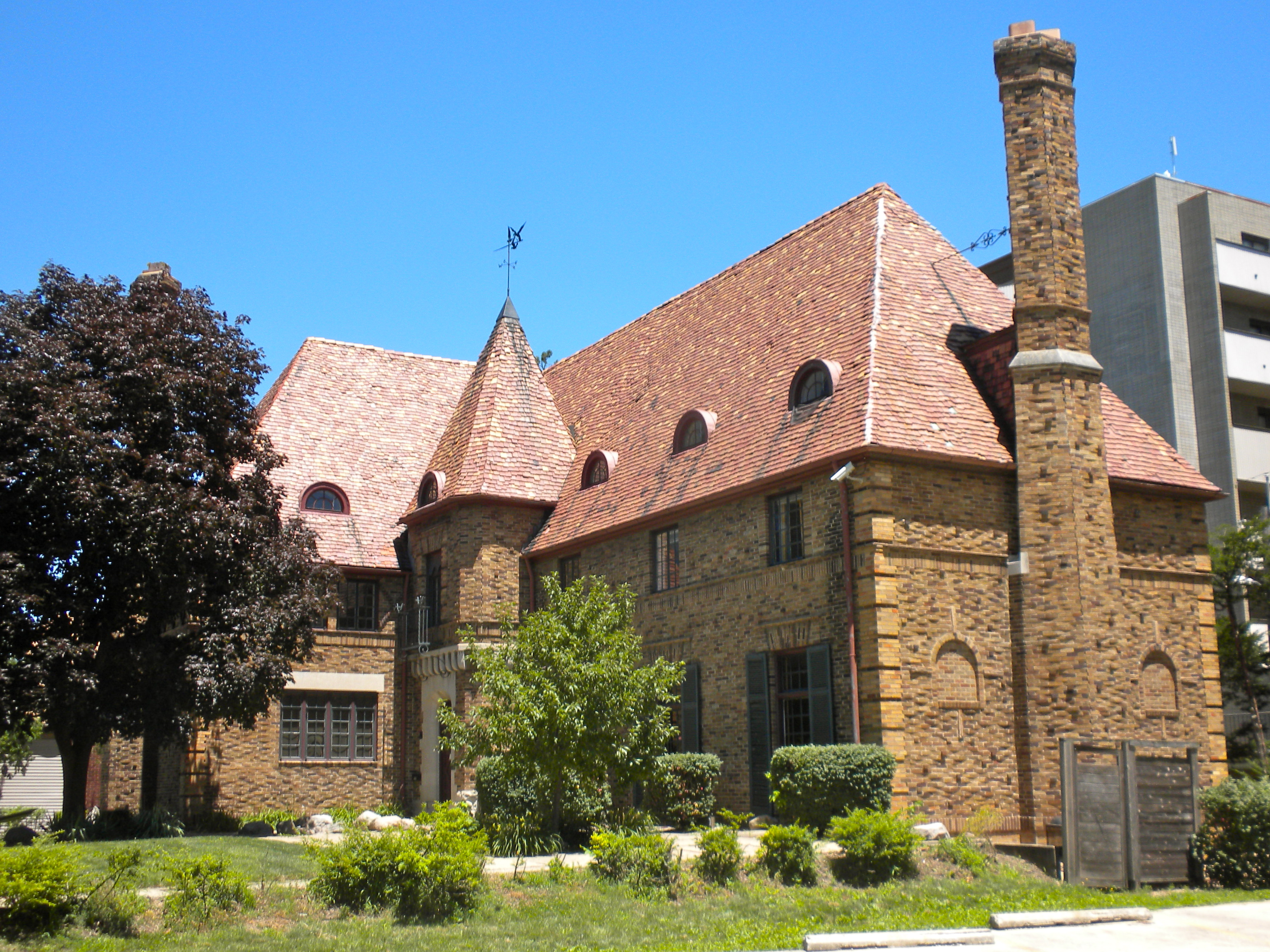
University of Illinois chapter house

== Symbols ==
Alpha Rho Chi's motto is Fidelitas, Amor et Artes or "Fidelity and Love of the Arts". Its colors are azure and sanguine. Its flower is the white rose. Its publications are The Archi and The Alpha Rho Chi Letter.

== Chapter houses ==
The Anthemios chapter house at the University of Illinois is on the National Register of Historic Places. It has eighteen bedrooms, most of which used to be double occupancy. Currently, only rooms 5–7, 16, and 17 are double occupancy. Keeping up with the progressive era, the Anthemios house changed to coed bathrooms in the late 2000s due to the influx of female brothers.

The Andronicus chapter house is listed as a Historic Cultural Monuments by the City of Los Angeles and is awaiting placement on the Federal Register of Historic Structures.

== Medals ==
The Alpha Rho Chi Bronze Medal is awarded annually at accredited schools of architecture in the United States and Canada to honor graduating seniors who have demonstrated leadership, service, and the promise of professional merit. The recipients of the medal are decided by the faculty of each school. Membership in the fraternity is not a criterion for the award, nor is membership conferred to the medal's recipients. The medal program was established in 1931. Designed by sculptor Robert Merrell Gage, the medal is cast in bronze and features an image of a seated Athena holding a skyscraper.

On occasion, Alpha Rho Chi recognizes other individuals with two other classes of medals. The fraternity awards the Alpha Rho Chi Silver Medal for fraternal service. The Gold Alpha Rho Chi Medal honors an outstanding practitioner of architecture or an allied art. Recent recipients of the gold medal include I.M. Pei and Samuel Balen.

== Chapters ==
Chapters take their names from architects of ancient Egypt, Greece, or Rome. Active chapters are in bold; inactive chapter are in italic.

Chapter	Charter date and range	Institution	Location	Status	Ref.
**Anthemios**	May 22, 1914	University of Illinois at Urbana-Champaign	Champaign, Illinois	Active	(Note: Originally the local group Sigma Upsilon, established in 1900.)
**Iktinos**	June 5, 1914	University of Michigan	Ann Arbor, Michigan	Active	(Note: Originally the local Arcus Society, established in 1911.)
**Demetrios**	February 25, 1916 – xxxx ?; February 1, 2020	Ohio State University	Columbus, Ohio	Active	(Note: Formed by absorbing the local group Tau Epsilon.)
**Mnesicles**	October 10, 1916	University of Minnesota	Minneapolis Minnesota	Active	(Note: Formed by absorbing the local Cyma Club.)
Kallikrates	February 15, 1922 – xxxx ?	University of Virginia	Charlottesville, Virginia	Inactive	
**Andronicus**	March 11, 1922	University of Southern California	Los Angeles, California	Active	
Paeonios	February 10, 1923 – 194x ?	Kansas State University	Manhattan, Kansas	Inactive	
**Dinocrates**	April 19, 1924 – xxxx ?, xxxx ?	University of Texas at Austin	Austin, Texas	Active	(Note: Formed by absorbing the local Delta Club.)
Polyklitos	May 24, 1924 – 194x ?	Carnegie Mellon University	Pittsburgh, Pennsylvania	Inactive	(Note: Chapter was named for Polykleitos the Younger who was famous for being an architect. The spelling variation appears to be a Greek-to-English translation error.)
Theron	May 23, 1926 – c. 1933	Oklahoma State University–Stillwater	Stillwater, Oklahoma	Inactive	
**Vitruvius**	March 27, 1955	Pennsylvania State University	State College, Pennsylvania	Active	(Note: Formed as a colony in 1954l)
**Satyros**	May 13, 1962	Arizona State University	Tempe, Arizona	Active	
**Metagenes**	March 23, 1969	Virginia Tech	Blacksburg, Virginia	Active	
Xenocles	September 13, 1970 – xxxx ?	University of Texas at Arlington	Arlington, Texas	Inactive	
Daphnis	November 23, 1980 – xxxx ?	University of Arkansas	Fayetteville, Arkansas	Inactive	
**Daedalus**	June 1980	California Polytechnic State University	San Luis Obispo, California	Active	
**Cleisthenes**	September 6, 1981	University of Houston	Houston, Texas	Active	
Heracleides	September 6, 1981 – xxxx ?	University of Oklahoma	Norman, Oklahoma	Inactive	
Rhoecus	April 8, 1984 – xxxx ?	University of Kansas	Lawrence, Kansas	Inactive	
**Apollodorus**	April 10, 1986	University of Florida	Gainesville, Florida	Active	
**Pytheos**	March 29, 1992	University of Nebraska–Lincoln	Lincoln, Nebraska	Active	
**Seshait**	March 12, 1994	Florida A&M University	Tallahassee, Florida	Active	
**Rabirius**	November 4, 2000/January 20, 2001	University of Cincinnati	Cincinnati, Ohio	Active	
Imhotep	October 19, 2002 – 20xx ?	University of Memphis	Memphis, Tennessee	Inactive	
**Nicon**	July 11, 2004	Florida International University	Miami, Florida	Active	
**Domitian**	January 30, 2005	New Jersey Institute of Technology	Newark, New Jersey	Active	
**Senenmut**	February 26, 2005	University at Buffalo	Buffalo, New York	Active	
**Hadrian**	November 4, 2006	Tulane University	New Orleans, Louisiana	Active	
**(Decimus) Cossutius**	January 20, 2008	California College of the Arts	San Francisco, California	Active	(Note: Formed as the Cossutius colony.)
**Sostratus**	April 19, 2009	Washington State University	Pullman, Washington	Active	
**Agamedes**	April 2, 2016	University of Miami	Coral Gables, Florida	Active	
**Isidorus**	April 30, 2011	Miami University	Oxford, Ohio	Active	
**Severus**	June 9, 2012	Kent State University	Kent, Ohio	Active	
**Philon**	January 26, 2013	Washington University in St. Louis	St. Louis, Missouri	Active	
**Callimachus**	March 2, 2013	University of California, Berkeley	Berkeley, California	Active	
Hemiunu	March 9, 2013 – 20xx ?	Howard University	Washington, D.C.	Inactive	
**Hippodamus**	March 9, 2013	Mississippi State University	Starkville, Mississippi	Active	
**Polyidus**	April 12, 2014	Southern Polytechnic State University	Marietta, Georgia	Active	
**Numisius**	May 3, 2014	NewSchool of Architecture and Design	San Diego, California	Active	
**Olynthius**	September 6, 2014	University of Maryland	College Park, Maryland	Active	
Aristobulus	March 7, 2015 – 20xx ?	Clemson University	Clemson, South Carolina	Inactive	
**Theodorus**	February 4, 2017	University of Tennessee	Knoxville, Tennessee	Active	
**Amenophis**	April 1, 2017	Southern Illinois University	Carbondale, Illinois	Active	
**Skopas**	June 2020	Syracuse University	Syracuse, New York	Active	

== Master architects ==
Master Architect is a special classification of fraternity membership to honor brothers who have gained national prominence in the field of architecture and the allied arts, or who have made significant contributions to the built environment. The following individuals have been installed as Master Architects (with year honored):

- Nathan Clifford Ricker (1914)
- Cass Gilbert (1924)
- Eliel Saarinen (1942)
- John Wellborn Root Jr. (1951)
- Ludwig Mies van der Rohe (1966)
- Richard Buckminster Fuller (1970)
- I.M. Pei (1981), the only Master Architect who is not to be a fraternity member
- Robert Ivy (2010)

== See also ==
- Professional fraternities and sororities
