= Heraclides of Erythrae =

Heraclides of Erythrae (Ancient Greek: Ἡρακλείδης; fl. 1st century BC), a physician of Erythrae in Ionia, who was a pupil of Chrysermus, a fellow-pupil of Apollonius, and a contemporary of Strabo in the 1st century BC. Galen calls him the most distinguished of the pupils of Chrysermus, and mentions a work written by him, On the school of Herophilus (Greek: Περὶ τῆς Ἡροφίλου Αἱρέσεως), consisting of at least seven books. He wrote a commentary on the sixth book of Hippocrates, De Morbis Vulgaribus, but neither this nor any of his writings survive.
