= Herodotus (physician) =

Herodotus (/hɪˈrɒdətəs/ hirr-OD-ə-təs; Ancient Greek: Ἡρόδοτος, romanized: Hēródotos, Attic Greek pronunciation: [hɛːródotos]) was the name of more than one physician in the time of ancient Greece and Rome:

- A pupil of Athenaeus, or perhaps Agathinus, who belonged to the Pneumatic school. He probably lived towards the end of the 1st century AD, and lived at Rome, where he practised medicine with great success. He wrote some medical works, which are several times quoted by Galen and Oribasius, but of which only some fragments remain.
- The son of Arieus, a native either of Tarsus or Philadelphia, who probably belonged to the Empiric school. He was a pupil of Menodotus of Nicomedia, and tutor to Sextus Empiricus, and lived therefore in the 2nd century AD.
- The physician mentioned by Galen, together with Euryphon, as having recommended human milk in cases of consumption, was probably a different person from either of the preceding, and may have been a contemporary of Euryphon in the 5th century BC.
