= Theodas of Laodicea =

Greek Pyrrhonist philosopher and physician

Theudas of Laodicea (Greek: Θευδάς ό Λαοδικεύς) was a Pyrrhonist philosopher and physician of the Empiric school, in the 2nd century. He is mentioned by Diogenes Laërtius as being a native of Laodicea in Syria, a pupil of Antiochus of Laodicea, and a contemporary of Menodotus. A physician of this name is also quoted by Andromachus.
