= Olympicus =

Olympicus or Olympiacus was a physician of Miletus of the 1st century AD.

He belonged to the sect of the Methodici, although he did not fully embrace their doctrines (Galen). He was the tutor of Apollonius of Cyprus.

Head of the methodical school in Alexandria, during the reign of Vespasian.

Galen described him as a frivolous person.
