= Glaucias (physician, 3rd century BC) =

Greek physician

Glaucias (Greek: Γλαυκίας; c. 3rd century BC) was a Greek physician of the Empiric school who wrote commentaries on the works of Hippocrates.

== Biography ==
He belonged to the Empiric school, and lived after Serapion of Alexandria, and before Heraclides of Tarentum, and therefore probably in the 3rd or 2nd century BC. Galen mentions him as one of the earliest commentators on the whole of the Hippocratic Corpus, and he also wrote an alphabetical glossary on the difficult words occurring in the Hippocratic collection. His commentaries on Hippocrates are several times quoted and referred to by Galen. It is uncertain whether he is the person quoted by Pliny.
