= Zeuxis =

Zeuxis may refer to:

- Zeuxis (general) (fl. 3rd century BC), Greek general
- Zeuxis (painter) (fl. 5th century BC), Greek painter
- Zeuxis of Tarentum (fl. 3rd century BC), Greek physician
- Zeuxis, a work by Lucian (2nd century AD)
- Zeuxis (wrestler) (born 1988), Puerto Rican professional wrestler
- Zeuxis (gastropod), a genus of sea snails in the family Nassariidae
