= Aeschrion of Pergamon =

2nd-century Greek physician

Aeschrion (Ancient Greek: Αἰσχρίων) of Pergamon was a physician in the 2nd century AD. He was one of Galen's tutors, who says that he belonged to the sect of the Empirici, and that he had a great knowledge of pharmacy and materia medica. Aeschrion was the inventor of a celebrated superstitious remedy for the bite of a mad dog, of which the most important ingredient was powdered crawfish. He directs these crawfish to be caught at a time when the sun and moon are in a particular relative position, and for them to be baked alive. This remedy is mentioned with approbation by Galen and Oribasius.
