= John of Alexandria =

7th century Byzantine medical writer

John of Alexandria (fl. 600–642) was a Byzantine medical writer who lived in Alexandria, in present-day Egypt.

He is thought to be the author of a commentary on Galen's De sectis, a Latin version of which survives in several manuscripts. He wrote a commentary on Hippocrates' book about the foetus (In Hippocratis De natura pueri commentarium), which survives in one Greek manuscript and in a 13th-century Latin version made for King Manfred of Sicily. He also wrote a commentary on the sixth book of Hippocrates' Epidemics (In Hippocratis Epidemiarum librum VI commentarii fragmenta), known from an anonymous Latin translation and from extracts from the Greek original, entered in the margins of a Greek translation of an Arabic medical text.
