= Bacchius of Tanagra =

3rd-century BC Greek physician

Bacchius of Tanagra (or Baccheius, Greek: Βακχεῖος ὁ Ταναγραῖος; 3rd century BC), was one of the earliest commentators on the writings of Hippocrates and was a native of Tanagra in Boeotia. He was a follower of Herophilos, and a contemporary of Philinus. Therefore, he must have lived in the 3rd century BC. Of his writings, (which were both valuable and interesting) nothing remains but a few fragments preserved by Erotianus and Galen, by whom he is frequently mentioned.
