= Robert Ivy =

American architect

Robert Ivy (FAIA) was the Executive Vice President and Chief Executive Officer of The American Institute of Architects (AIA) 2011 to 2021.

== Biography ==
Robert Ivy holds a Master of Architecture from Tulane University and a Bachelor of Arts (cum laude) in English from Sewanee: The University of the South.

In 1996, Ivy became the Editor in Chief of Architectural Record. He became Vice President and Editorial Director of McGraw-Hill Construction Media, which included GreenSource: The Magazine of Sustainable Design, SNAP, Architectural Record: China, HQ Magazine, ENR, Constructor, and Sweets. From 1981 until 1996, he was a principal at Dean/Dale, Dean & Ivy and a critic for many national publications.

Ivy was a juror on the panel that selected architect Frank Gehry to design the National Dwight D. Eisenhower Memorial.

In December 2010, Robert Ivy was named CEO of the American Institute of Architects (AIA), effective February 2011.

== Other roles ==
- Senior Fellow of the Design Futures Council

== Awards ==
- 2018: Noel Polk Lifetime Achievement Award by the Mississippi Institute of Arts and Letters
- 2010: Master Architect by Alpha Rho Chi (the only architect selected in the 21st century)
- 2009: Crain Award
- 1998: McGraw-Hill Award for Management Excellence
- 1993: AIA College of Fellows

== Publications ==
- Fay Jones: Architect
