= Philinus of Cos =

Philinus of Cos (Greek: Φιλῖνος ὁ Κῷος; 3rd century BC) was a Greek physician. He was the reputed founder of the Empiric school. He was a pupil of Herophilus, a contemporary of Bacchius, and a predecessor of Serapion. He wrote a work on part of the Hippocratic collection directed against Bacchius, and also one on botany, neither of which has survived. It is perhaps this later work that is quoted by Athenaeus, Pliny , and Andromachus.
