= Athenion (physician) =

Ancient Greek physician

Athenion (Ancient Greek: Ἀθηνίων) was a physician of ancient Greece, probably from Athens. He was mentioned by the physician and medical writer Soranus of Ephesus as being a member of the Empiric school, and a follower of the celebrated anatomist Erasistratus, and so must therefore have lived some time between the third century BCE and the first century CE.

Soranus writes that Athenion believed that there were diseases peculiar to women, or at least conditions peculiar to women, that merited women's health being looked at differently from the way men's health was.

There is another obscure physician of this name whose works are mentioned by Aulus Cornelius Celsus, who may be the same person.
