= Heracleides of Odessus =

Ancient Greek historian

Heracleides (Ancient Greek: Ἡρακλείδης) of Odessus, in Thrace, was an ancient Greek historian mentioned by Stephanus of Byzantium.
