= Aelius Nicon =

2nd century Greek architect and father of Galen

Aelius Nicon was a Greek architect and builder in 2nd century AD Pergamon. Nicon is known as the father of the ancient anatomist and philosopher, Galen.

Nicon was a mathematician, architect, astronomer, philosopher, and devotee of Greek literature. Nicon closely supervised Galen's education and tutored him at home, intending his son to study philosophy or politics. However, according to Galen, Nicon was visited in a dream by Asclepius, Greek god of healing, who told him to allow his son to study medicine. Galen soon began his studies at the major sanctuary of Asclepius located in Pergamon.

In his book, On the Passions and Errors of the Soul, Galen says that his "father's training lay chiefly in the sciences of geometry, arithmetic, architecture, and astronomy". He also describes his temperament:

"But I did enjoy the good fortune of having the least irascible, the most just, the most devoted, and kindest of fathers. My mother, however, was so very prone to anger that sometimes she bit her handmaids; she constantly shrieked at my father and fought with him — more than Xanthippe did with Socrates. When I compared my father’s noble deeds with the disgraceful passions of my mother, I decided to embrace and love his deeds and to flee and hate her passions. Just as in these respects I saw the utter difference between my parents, so also did I see it in the fact that my father (seemed) never to be grieved over any loss, whereas my mother was vexed over the smallest things."

== Sources ==
- Galen: a Biographical Sketch
- Innovators & Pioneers: Galen
