= Heracleides (uncle) =

Heracleides (Ancient Greek: Ἡρακλείδης) was a man of ancient Syracuse, Sicily, Magna Graecia, who was a relative of Agathocles of Syracuse, probably his uncle, and probably distinct from another Heracleides. Nothing further is known of him.

There was a group in Syracuse at the time called the "Six Hundred Noblest" that was composed of the most influential citizens. Its leaders were Heracleides (Heraclides) and Sosistratus. Some scholars have suggested it possible that this Heracleides could be the same as Agathocles's uncle Heracleides, which would have implications for the common story of the low social station of Agathocles's family.
