= Heraclides (290 BC) =

Officer of Demetrius Poliorcetes commanding the garrison of Athens

Heracleides (Ancient Greek: Ἡρακλείδης) was an officer appointed by Demetrius I of Macedon to command the garrison which he left at Athens, apparently in 290 BC. An attempt was made by the Athenians to possess themselves of the fortress in his charge (whether this was the Museum or the Peiraeeus does not appear, but probably the former) by a secret negotiation with Hierocles, a Carian leader of mercenaries; but the plan was betrayed by Hierocles to his commanding officer, and Heracleides caused the Athenians to be admitted into the fort, to the number of 420 men, when they were surrounded by his troops, and cut to pieces.
