= Serapion of Alexandria =

Greek physician

Serapion of Alexandria (Ancient Greek: Σεραπίων ὁ Ἀλεξανδρεύς) was a physician who lived in the 3rd century BC. He belonged to the Empiric school, and so much extended and improved the system of Philinus of Cos, that the creation of the school is attributed to him by some ancient writers. Serapion wrote against Hippocrates with much vehemence, but neither this, nor any of his other works, have survived. He is several times mentioned by Celsus, Galen, Caelius Aurelianus, Aëtius, Paulus Aegineta, and Nicolaus Myrepsus.
