= Heraclides (physician) =

5th-century BC Greek physician

Heracleides (Ancient Greek: Ἡρακλείδης) was a physician of ancient Greece who was said to have been the sixteenth in descent from Aesculapius, the son of Hippocrates I, who lived probably in the fifth century BC. He married a woman named Phaeniarete, or, according to others, Praxithea, by whom he had two sons, Sosander and the renowned ancient physician Hippocrates.

Many historical researchers attribute the authorship of various works to Heracleides of Kos, such as the "Hippocratic Collection," "Prognostics," and parts of the "Aphorisms," among others.
