= Heracleides (409 BC) =

Heracleides (Ancient Greek: Ἡρακλείδης), son of Aristogenes, was a Syracusan from Magna Graecia who was one of the commanders of the Syracusan squadron sent to co-operate with the Lacedaemonians and their allies. He joined Tissaphernes at Ephesus just in time to take part in the defeat of the Athenians under Thrasyllus in 409 BC.
