= Heraclides (son of Argaeus) =

Heraclides (Ancient Greek: Ἡρακλείδης), son of Argaeus was an admiral sent by Alexander, shortly before his death, to construct ships on the Caspian Sea, with a view to a voyage of discovery, similar to that of Nearchus. Whether the task was ever undertaken or completed is not known. Patrocles a general of Seleucus I is reported to have undertaken an exploration on the Caspian Sea.
