= Heraclides of Tarentum =

Greek physician

Heraclides of Tarentum (Ancient Greek: Ἡρακλείδης ὁ Ταραντῖνος; fl. 3rd – 2nd century BC), was an Ancient Greek physician of the Empiric school who wrote commentaries on the works of Hippocrates. He came from Tarentum, was a pupil of Mantias, and probably lived in the 3rd or 2nd century BC, somewhat later than Apollonius Empiricus and Glaucias. He belonged to the Empiric school, and wrote some works on Materia medica, which are very frequently quoted by Galen, but of which only a few fragments remain. Galen speaks of him in high terms of praise, saying that he was an author who could be entirely depended upon, as he wrote in his works only what he had himself found from his own experience to be correct. He was also one of the first persons who wrote a commentary on all the works in the Hippocratic Corpus. He is several times quoted by Caelius Aurelianus and other ancient authors.
