= Heracleides of Byzantium =

Ambassador of the Seleucid Empire to the Roman Republic

Heracleides (Ancient Greek: Ἡρακλείδης) of Byzantium, was sent as ambassador by Antiochus III the Great to the two Scipios -- Scipio Africanus and Lucius Cornelius Scipio Asiaticus -- immediately after they had crossed the Hellespont in 190 BC. He was instructed to offer, in the king's name, the cession of the cities of Lampsacus, Smyrna, and some other cities of Ionia and Aeolis, and the payment of half the expenses of the war; but these offers were sternly rejected by the Romans: and Heracleides, having in vain sought to gain over Scipio Africanus by a private negotiation, returned to Antiochus to report the failure of his mission.
