= Heracleides (ambassador) =

Heracleides (Ancient Greek: Ἡρακλείδης) was one of the three ambassadors sent by the Seleucid ruler Antiochus IV Epiphanes to Rome to support his claims on Coele-Syria against Ptolemy VI Philometor, and defend his conduct in waging war upon him, 169 BC.

The same three ambassadors seem to have been sent again after Antiochus had been interrupted in his career of conquest by the mission of Popillius, and compelled to raise the siege of Alexandria. It is not improbable that this Heracleides is the same who is spoken of by Appian as one of the favorites of Antiochus Epiphanes, by whom he was appointed to superintend the finances of his whole kingdom.

After the death of Antiochus, and the establishment of Demetrius I Soter upon the throne in 162 BC, Heracleides was driven into exile by the new sovereign. In order to revenge himself, he gave his support to, if he did not originate, the imposture of Alexander Balas, who set up a claim to the throne of Syria, pretending to be a son of Antiochus Epiphanes. Heracleides repaired, together with the pretender and Laodice VI, daughter of Antiochus, to Rome, where, by the lavish distribution of his great wealth, and the influence of his popular manners and address, he succeeded in obtaining an ambiguous promise of support from the Roman senate. Of this he immediately availed himself to raise a force of mercenary troops for the invasion of Syria, and effected a landing, together with Alexander, at Ephesus.

What became of him after this we know not, as his name is not mentioned during the struggle that ensued between Alexander and Demetrius, nor after the elevations of the former to the throne of Syria.
