= Heracleides of Alexandria =

Heracleides (Ancient Greek: Ἡρακλείδης) of Alexandria was a Greek grammarian, who is perhaps the same as the one whom Ammonius mentions as a contemporary of his.

The same name is often mentioned by Eustathius, and in the Venetian scholia on the Iliad, in connection with grammatical works on Homer, and Ammonius attributes to one Heracleides a work entitled Περὶ καθολικῆς προσώδίας.
