= Heracleides of Magnesia =

Heracleides (Ancient Greek: Ἡρακλείδης) of Magnesia, is known only as the author of a history of Mithridates VI of Pontus (Μιθριδατικά), which is lost.
