= Heracleides the Phocian =

Ancient Greek sculptor

Heracleides (Ancient Greek: Ἡρακλείδης) was a sculptor of ancient Greece, from Phocis, of whom nothing more is known.
