= Heraclides (son of Antiochus) =

Heraclides or Heracleides (Ancient Greek: Ἡρακλείδης), son of Antiochus, was hipparch of the ile of Hetairoi from Bottiaea, from the Triballian campaign of Alexander the Great in 335 BC until the battle of Gaugamela.
