= Heracleides (architect) =

Heracleides (Ancient Greek: Ἡρακλείδης) was an architect in the time of the Roman emperor Trajan, who is known by two inscriptions found in Egypt.
