= Menodotus of Nicomedia =

Menodotus of Nicomedia (Greek: Μηνόδοτος ὁ Νικομηδεύς; 2nd century CE), in Bithynia, was a physician; a pupil of Antiochus of Laodicea; and tutor to Herodotus of Tarsus. He belonged to the Empiric school, and lived probably about the beginning of the 2nd century CE. He refuted some of the opinions of Asclepiades of Bithynia, and was exceedingly severe against the Dogmatic school. He enjoyed a considerable reputation in his day, and is several times quoted and mentioned by Galen. He appears to have written some works which are quoted by Diogenes Laërtius, but are not now extant.
