= Erotianus =

Ancient Greek author on Hippocrates

Erotianus (Greek: Ἐρωτιανός, also Herodianus, Greek: Ἡρωδιανός; 1st century AD) was the author of an extant Greek work titled Collection of Hippocratic words (Greek: Τῶν παρ' Ἱπποκράτει Λέξεων Συναγωγή). It is uncertain whether he was himself a physician or merely a grammarian, but he appears to have written (or at least to have intended to write) some other works on Hippocrates besides that which we now possess.

He must have lived (and probably at Rome) in the reign of the emperor Nero (54–68 AD), as his work is dedicated to his archiater, Andromachus. It is notable for containing the earliest list of the writings of Hippocrates that exists, and contains the titles of several treatises now lost, but excludes several that now form part of the Hippocratic Corpus. The rest of the work consists of a glossary, in which the words are at present arranged in a partially alphabetical manner, though it appears that this mode of arrangement is not that which was adopted by the author himself.
