= Empiric school =

School of medicine in ancient Greece and Rome

The Empiric school of medicine (Empirics, Empiricists, or Empirici, Greek: Ἐμπειρικοί) was a school of medicine founded in Alexandria the middle of the third century BC. The school was a major influence on ancient Greek and Roman medicine. The school's name is derived from the word empeiria (ἐμπειρία "experience") because they professed to derive their knowledge from experiences only, and in doing so set themselves in opposition to the Dogmatic school. Serapion of Alexandria, and Philinus of Cos, are regarded as the founders of this school in the 3rd century BC. Other physicians who belonged to this sect were: Apollonius of Citium, Glaucias, Heraclides, Bacchius, Zeuxis, Menodotus, Theodas, Herodotus of Tarsus, Aeschrion, Sextus Empiricus, and Marcellus Empiricus. The sect survived a long time, as Marcellus lived in the 4th century AD. The doctrines of this school are described by Aulus Cornelius Celsus in the introduction to his De Medicina.

== Doctrines ==
The Empiric school said that it was necessary to understand the evident causes of disease, but considered the inquiry after the hidden causes and natural actions to be fruitless, because Nature is incomprehensible. That these things cannot be understood appears from the controversies among philosophers and physicians, and in the way in which the methods of practice differed from place to place, one method being used in Rome, another in Egypt, and another in Gaul. Often too, the causes are evident; as in a wound, and if the evident cause does not suggest a method of curing, then much less so other obscure methods. This being the case, it is much better to seek relief from things certain and tried; that is, from remedies as learned from experience.

They said that medicine, in its infancy, was deduced from experiments; for the sick, in a time when there were no physicians, had either taken food in the first days of their illness, or had abstained, and that the illness was more quickly alleviated in one group than the other. This and other instances occurring daily were observed by people diligent enough to realize which method was best to cure particular conditions, and hence the art of medicine arose. Medicine was not invented in consequence of reasoning, but that theory was sought after the discovery of medicine.

They asked, too, whether reason prescribed the same as experience, or something different: if the same, then it is not necessary; if different, then mischievous. Initially there was a necessity to examine remedies with the greatest accuracy, but now they are sufficiently ascertained; there are no new diseases, and hence no need for any novel methods of healing. If a patient had an unknown type of illness, the physician would not recourse to obscure knowledge, but would see what type of illness was most nearly allied, and to make a trial of the medicines used to treat the allied condition.

What matters is not what causes, but what cures the condition. It does not matter why a concoction works, only that it does work. Nor is it necessary to know how we breathe, but what relieves difficult breathing. Likewise we should not seek the cause of motion in the arteries, but what each kind of motion indicates. These things are known by experience and epilogistic reasoning. There is no value in dissecting dead bodies, since the state of the organs are very different in dead bodies compared to living ones.

They supported their opinions in favour of experience with the famous "Tripod of Medicine":

- Observation: The observations which the patient had made in the course of the illness concerning the course of the disease and results of any treatments.
- History: A written collection of observations made by others.
- Analogy: When treating a new illness, selecting a plan of treatment by comparing it with a known disease which most resembled it.

== Adherents ==
- Aeschrion of Pergamon
- Apollonius of Citium
- Athenion
- Bacchius
- Glaucias (physician)
- Heraclides of Tarentum
- Herodotus of Tarsus
- Marcellus Empiricus
- Menodotus of Nicomedia
- Sextus Empiricus
- Theodas of Laodicea
- Zeuxis of Tarentum

== See also ==
- Dogmatic school – School of medicine in ancient Greece and Rome
- Methodic school – School of medicine in ancient Greece and Rome

== Bibliography ==
- William Smith, (1857), Dictionary of Greek and Roman Antiquities, pages 401–3
