= Herophilos =

Greek physician (335–280 BC)

Herophilos of Chalcedon
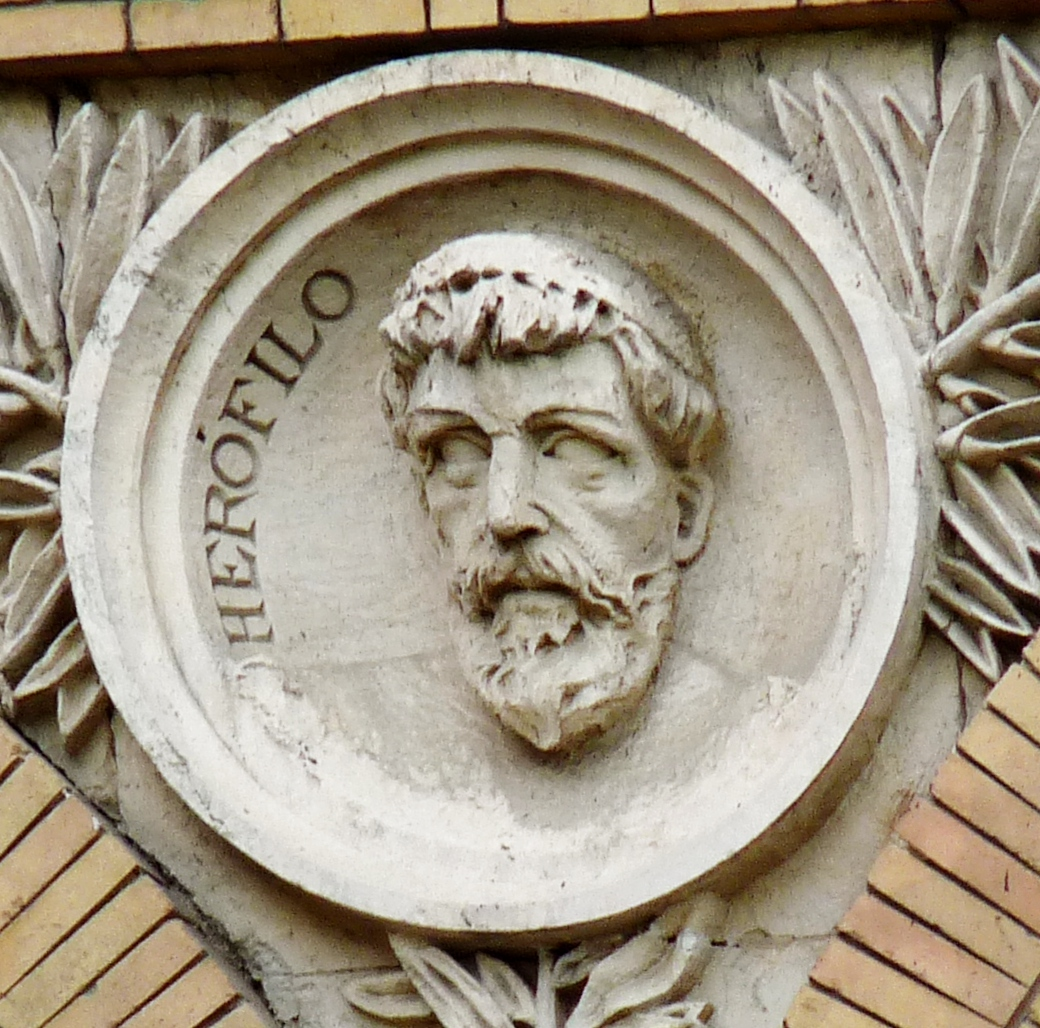
- Medallion with a relief depicting Herophilus in the Old Faculty of Medicine of Zaragoza.
- Born: c. 335 BC; Chalcedon, ancient Greece
- Died: c. 280 BC (aged approximately 55)
- Occupation: Physician
- Era: Classical Greece

Herophilos (/hɪˈrɒfɪləs/; Ancient Greek: Ἡρόφιλος; 335–280 BC), sometimes Latinised Herophilus, was a Greek physician regarded as one of the earliest anatomists. Born in Chalcedon, he spent the majority of his life in Alexandria. He was the first scientist to systematically perform scientific dissections of human cadavers. He recorded his findings in over nine works, which are now all lost. The early Christian author Tertullian states that Herophilos vivisected at least 600 prisoners; however, this account has been disputed by many historians. He is often seen as the father of anatomy.

== Biography ==
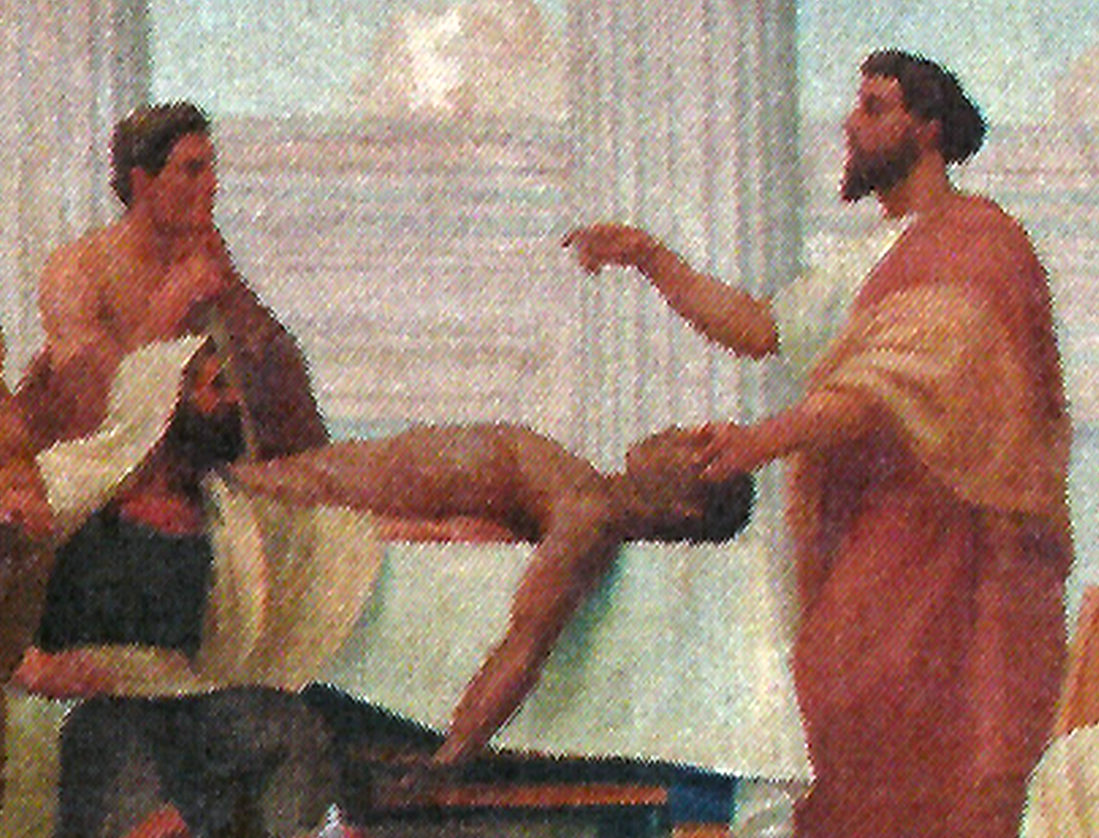
Herophilos (right) teaching Anatomy, 1906, by Veloso Salgado (NOVA Medical School, Lisbon)

Herophilos was born in Chalcedon in Asia Minor (now Kadıköy, Turkey), c. 335 BC. Not much is known about his early life other than he moved to Alexandria at a fairly young age to begin his schooling.

As an adult Herophilos was a teacher, and an author of at least nine texts ranging from his book titled On Pulses, which explored the flow of blood from the heart through the arteries, to his book titled Midwifery, which discussed duration and phases of childbirth. In Alexandria, he practiced dissections, often publicly so that he could explain what he was doing to those who were fascinated. Erasistratus was his contemporary. Together, they worked at a medical school in Alexandria that is said to have drawn people from all over the ancient world due to Herophilos's fame.

His works are lost but were much quoted by Galen in the second century AD. Herophilos was the first scientist to systematically perform scientific dissections of human cadavers. Dissections of human cadavers were banned in most places at the time, except for Alexandria. Celsus in De Medicina and the church leader Tertullian state that he vivisected at least 600 live prisoners, though this has been contested as Herophilos appeared to have believed the arteries contained very little blood. It is unlikely that he would have held this belief if he had performed a vivisection.

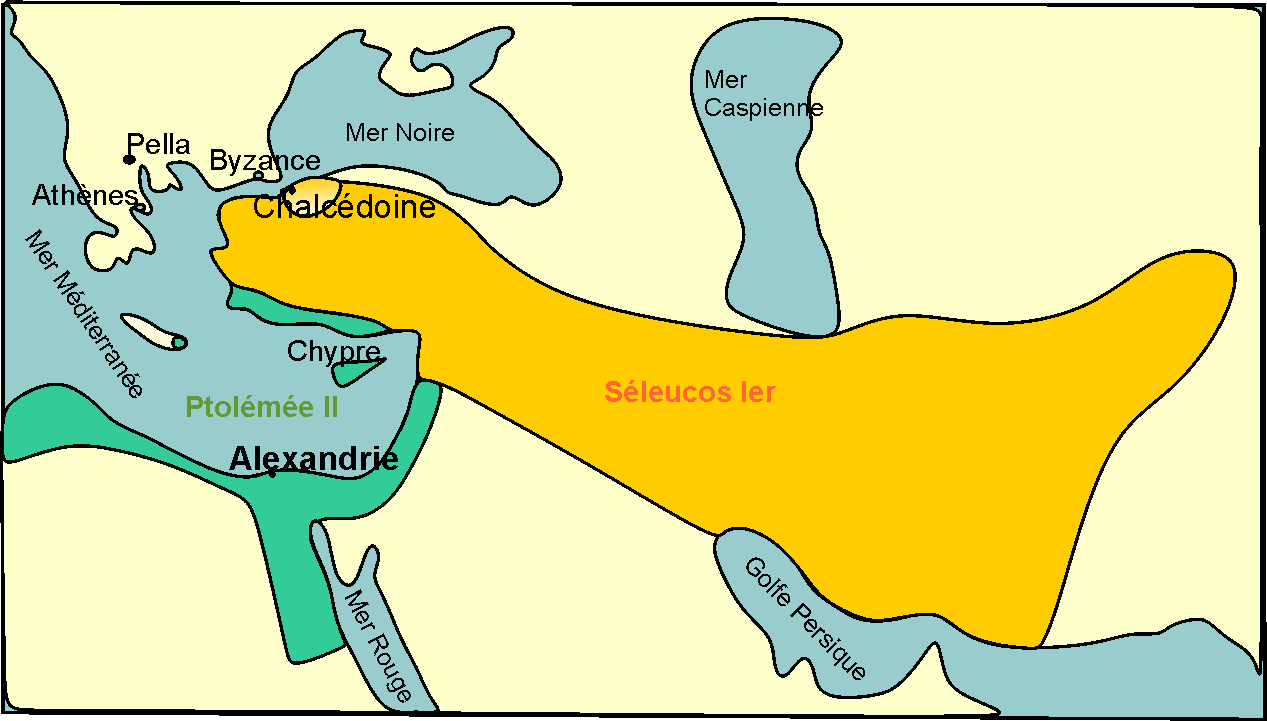
The Hellenistic world in 281

After the death of Herophilos in 280 BC, his anatomical findings lived on in the works of other important physicians, notably Galen. The Middle Ages witnessed the revival of an interest in medical studies, including human dissection and autopsy. Frederick II (1194–1250), the Holy Roman Emperor, decreed that any that were studying to be a physician or a surgeon must attend a human dissection, which would be held no less than every five years. Some European countries began legalizing the dissection of executed criminals for educational purposes in the late 13th and early 14th centuries. Mondino de Luzzi carried out the first recorded public dissection around 1315. Dissecting with the purpose to gain knowledge about human anatomy continued in early modern times (Vesalius).

== Medical knowledge ==
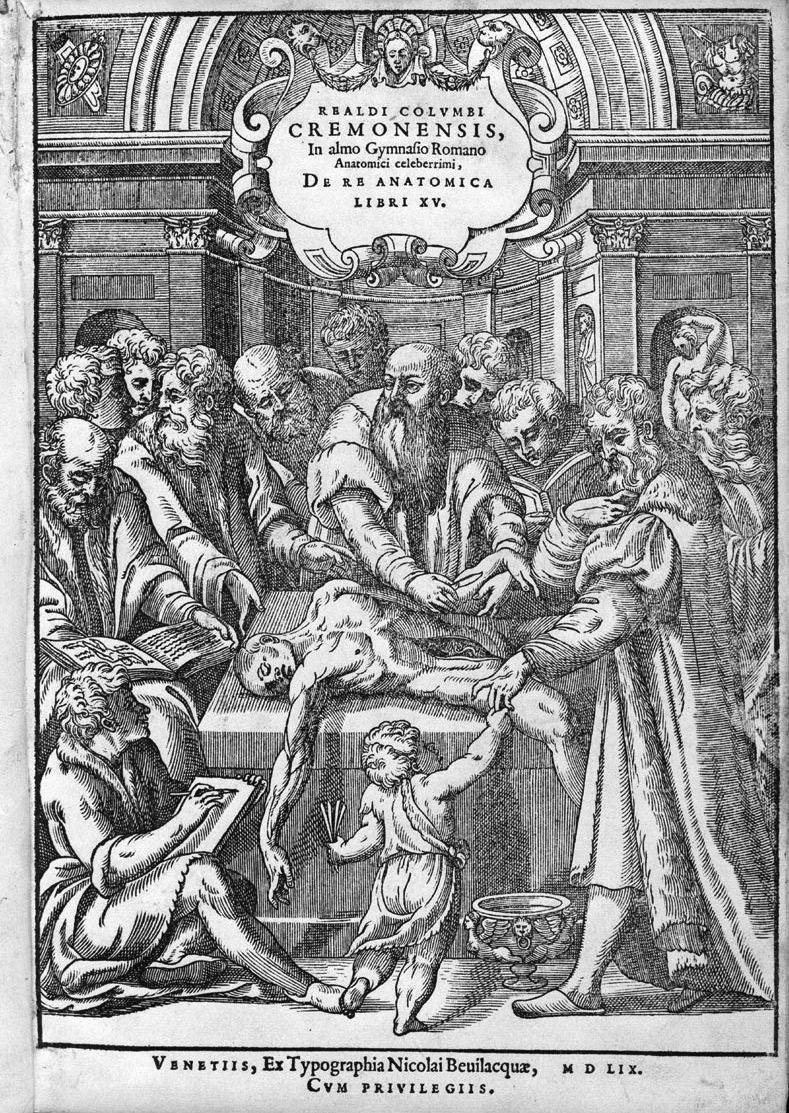
De Re Anatomica (1559).

Herophilos emphasised the use of the experimental method in medicine, for he considered it essential to found knowledge on empirical bases. He was a forerunner of the Empiric school of medicine, founded by Herophilos's pupil Philinus of Cos, which combined Herophilos's empirical impulses with critical tools borrowed from Pyrrhonist philosophy. However, the Empirics found Herophilos wanting, mounting two chief attacks against him:

1. that anatomy was useless to the therapeutic and clinical practice of medicine, as demonstrated by Herophilos's own acceptance of humoral pathology.
2. it was useless and epistemologically unsound to try to find causal explanations from the evident to the non-evident.

Conventional medicine of the time revolved around the theory of the four humors in which an imbalance between bile, black bile, phlegm, and blood led to sickness or disease. Veins were believed to be filled with blood and a mixture of air and water. Through dissections, Herophilus was able to deduce that veins carried only blood. After studying the flow of blood, he was able to differentiate between arteries and veins. He noticed that as blood flowed through arteries, they pulsed or rhythmically throbbed. He worked out standards for measuring a pulse and could use these standards to aid him in diagnosing sicknesses or diseases. To measure this pulse, he made use of a water clock.

Herophilos's work on blood and its movements led him to study and analyse the brain. He proposed that the brain housed the intellect rather than the heart, an early statement of the cephalocentric hypothesis. He was the first person to differentiate between the cerebrum and the cerebellum, and to place individual importance on each portion. He looked more in depth into the network of nerves located in the cranium.

Herophilos was particularly interested in the eye. He described the optic nerve for seeing and the oculomotor nerve for eye movements. Through his dissection of the eye, he discovered its different sections and layers: the "skin" of the eyeball comprising the cornea (the clear part at the front of the eye through which light begins to be focussed into the eye) and sclera (the white of the eye), the iris (the colored part of the eye surrounding the pupil), the retina (containing the cells converting light into neural activity), and the choroid (a layer between the retina and the sclera comprising connective tissue and blood vessels nourishing the retina). Herophilos used the term retiform to describe the retina, from its resemblance to a casting net, giving the origin of the modern term.

Further study of the cranium led Herophilos to describe the calamus scriptorius, which he believed was the seat of the human soul. Analysis of the nerves in the cranium allowed him to differentiate between nerves and blood vessels and to discover the differences between motor and sensory nerves. He believed that the sensory and motor nerves shot out from the brain and that the neural transmissions occurred by means of pneuma. Part of Herophilos's beliefs about the human body involved the pneuma, which he believed was a substance that flowed through the arteries along with the blood. To make this consistent with medical beliefs at the time, Herophilos stated that diseases occurred when an excess of one of the four humors impeded the pneuma from reaching the brain.

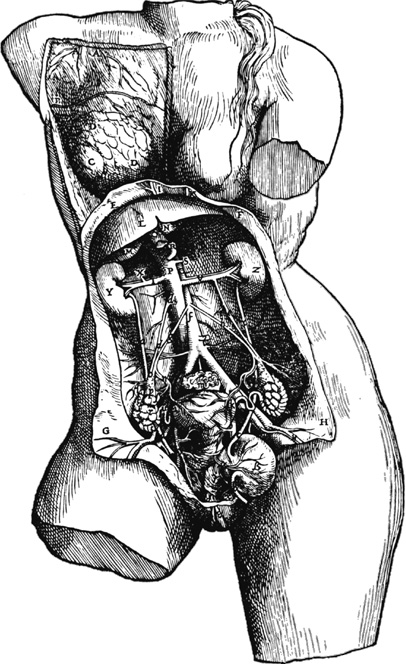
Fabrica: first representation of the ovaries.

Herophilos also introduced many other scientific terms used to this day to describe anatomical phenomena. He was among the first to introduce the notion of conventional terminology, as opposed to use of "natural names", using terms he created to describe the objects of study, naming them for the first time. A confluence of sinuses in the skull was originally named torcular Herophili after him. Torcular is a Latin translation of Herophilos's label, ληνός - lenos, 'wine vat' or 'wine press'. He also named the duodenum, which is part of the small intestine. Other areas of his anatomical study include the liver, the pancreas, and the alimentary tract, as well as the salivary glands and genitalia.

Herophilos is credited with learning extensively about the physiology of the female reproductive system. In his book Midwifery, he discussed phases and duration of pregnancy as well as causes for difficult childbirth. The aim of this work was to help midwives and other doctors of the time more fully understand the process of procreation and pregnancy. He is also credited with the discovery of the ovum, and was the first to make a scientific description of what would later be called Skene's gland, for which in 2001 the term female prostate was accepted as a second term.

Herophilos believed that exercise and a healthy diet were integral to an individual's bodily health. He once said that "when health is absent, wisdom cannot reveal itself, art cannot become manifest, strength cannot be exerted, wealth is useless, and reason is powerless".

== See also ==
- Timeline of medicine and medical technology
- Alcmaeon of Croton
- Cephalocentric hypothesis

== Sources ==
- von Staden H. (ed. trans.) Herophilos: The Art of Medicine in Early Alexandria. Cambridge University Press, 1989 ISBN 978-0-521-23646-1
- Simon Hornblower and Anthony Spawford, "Herophilos", The Oxford Classical Dictionary. (New York: Oxford University Press, 1999) 699.
- "Herophilus", Encyclopedia of World Biography, Supplement Vol. 25 Thomson Gale. (Michigan: Gale).
- Adrian Wills, "Herophilus, Erasistratus, and the birth of neuroscience", The Lancet. (November 13, 1999): 1719 Expanded Academic ASAP. Gale, 30 Nov. 2008.
- "On the Localisation of the Functions of the Brain with Special Reference to the Faculty of Language", Anthropological Review, Vol. 6, (Oct., 1868) 336.
- Galen. On the natural faculties. Brock A. J. (trans.) Heinemann, London 1916. p. xii, 233
