= Galen =

Greek physician, surgeon, and philosopher (c. 129–216 AD)

- Κλαύδιος Γαληνός
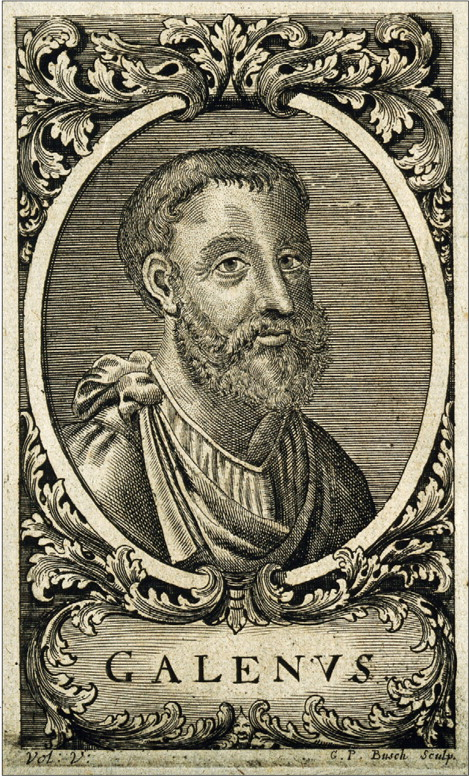
- A 17th-century engraving by Georg P. Busch
- Born: 129 CE; Pergamon, Roman Asia
- Died: c. 216 CE (aged c. 87)
- Scientific career
- Fields: Anatomy; Medicine; Philosophy

Aelius Galenus or Claudius Galenus (Greek: Κλαύδιος Γαληνός; September 129 – c. 216 CE), often anglicized as Galen (/ˈɡeɪlən/) or Galen of Pergamon, was a Roman and Greek physician, surgeon, and philosopher. Considered to be one of the most accomplished of all medical researchers of antiquity, Galen influenced the development of various scientific disciplines, including anatomy, physiology, pathology, pharmacology, and neurology, as well as philosophy and logic.

The son of Aelius Nicon, a wealthy Greek architect with scholarly interests, Galen received a comprehensive education that prepared him for a successful career as a physician and philosopher. Born in the ancient city of Pergamon (present-day Bergama, Turkey), Galen traveled extensively, exposing himself to a wide variety of medical theories and discoveries before settling in Rome, where he served prominent members of Roman society and eventually was given the position of personal physician to several emperors.

Galen's understanding of anatomy and medicine was principally influenced by the contemporary theory of the four humors: black bile, yellow bile, blood, and phlegm, as first advanced by the author of On the Nature of Man in the Hippocratic corpus. Galen's views dominated and influenced Western medical science for more than 1,300 years. His anatomical reports were based mainly on the dissection of Barbary apes. However, while dissections and vivisections on humans were practiced in Alexandria by Herophilus and Erasistratus in the 3rd century BCE under Ptolemaic permission, by Galen's time these procedures were strictly forbidden in the Roman Empire. As Galen discovered that the facial expressions of the Barbary apes were particularly vivid, Galen switched to pigs for his research to avoid prosecution. Aristotle had used pigs centuries earlier for his study of anatomy and physiology. Galen, like others, reasoned that animal anatomy had a strong consilience with that of humans. Galen would encourage his students to go look at dead gladiators or bodies that washed up in order to get better acquainted with the human body.

Galen's theory of the physiology of the circulatory system remained unchallenged until c. 1242, when Ibn al-Nafis published his book Sharh tashrih al-qanun li' Ibn Sina (Commentary on Anatomy in Avicenna's Canon), in which he reported his discovery of pulmonary circulation. His anatomical reports remained uncontested until 1543, when printed descriptions and illustrations of human dissections were published in the seminal work De humani corporis fabrica by Andreas Vesalius, where Galen's physiological theory was accommodated to these new observations.

Galen saw himself as both a physician and a philosopher, as he wrote in his treatise titled That the Best Physician Is Also a Philosopher. Galen was very interested in the debate between the rationalist and empiricist medical sects, and his use of direct observation, dissection, and vivisection represents a complex middle ground between the extremes of those two viewpoints. Many of his works have been preserved or translated from the original Greek, although many were destroyed and some credited to him are believed to be spurious. Although there is some debate over the date of his death, he was no younger than seventy when he died.

== Biography ==
Galen's Greek name Γαληνός (Galēnós) comes from the adjective γαληνός (galēnós) 'calm'. Galen's Latin name (Aelius or Claudius) implies he had Roman citizenship.

Galen describes his early life in On the affections of the mind. He was born in September 129 CE. His father, Aelius Nicon, was a wealthy patrician, an architect and builder, with eclectic interests including philosophy, mathematics, logic, astronomy, agriculture and literature. Galen describes his father as a "highly amiable, just, good and benevolent man". At that time Pergamon (modern-day Bergama, Turkey) was a major cultural and intellectual centre, noted for its library, second only to that in Alexandria, as well as being the site of a large temple to the healing god Asclepius. The city attracted both Stoic and Platonic philosophers, to whom Galen was exposed at the age of 14. His studies also took in each of the principal philosophical systems of the time, including Aristotelian and Epicurean. His father had planned a traditional career for Galen in philosophy or politics and took care to expose him to literary and philosophical influences. However, Galen states that in around 145 his father had a dream in which the god Asclepius appeared and commanded Nicon to send his son to study medicine.

=== Medical education ===
Following his earlier liberal education, Galen at age 16 began his studies at the prestigious local healing temple or asclepeion as a θεραπευτής (therapeutes, or attendant) for four years. There he came under the influence of men like Aeschrion of Pergamon, Stratonicus and Satyrus. Asclepiea functioned as spas or sanitoria to which the sick would come to seek the ministrations of the priesthood. Romans frequented the temple at Pergamon in search of medical relief from illness and disease. It was also the haunt of notable people such as the historian Claudius Charax, the orator Aelius Aristides, the sophist Polemo, and the consul Cuspius Rufinus.

Galen's father died in 148, leaving Galen independently wealthy at the age of 19. He then followed the advice he found in Hippocrates' teaching and traveled and studied widely including such destinations as Smyrna (now İzmir), Corinth, Crete, Cilicia (now Çukurova), Cyprus, and finally the great medical school of Alexandria, exposing himself to the various schools of thought in medicine. In 157, aged 28, he returned to Pergamon as physician to the gladiators of the High Priest of Asia, one of the most influential and wealthy men in Asia. Galen claims that the High Priest chose him over other physicians after he eviscerated an ape and challenged other physicians to repair the damage. When they refused, Galen performed the surgery himself and in so doing won the favor of the High Priest of Asia. Over his four years there, he learned the importance of diet, fitness, hygiene, and preventive measures, as well as living anatomy, and the treatment of fractures and severe trauma, referring to their wounds as "windows into the body". Only five deaths among the gladiators occurred while he held the post, compared to sixty in his predecessor's time, a result that is in general ascribed to the attention he paid to their wounds. At the same time he pursued studies in theoretical medicine and philosophy.

=== Rome ===
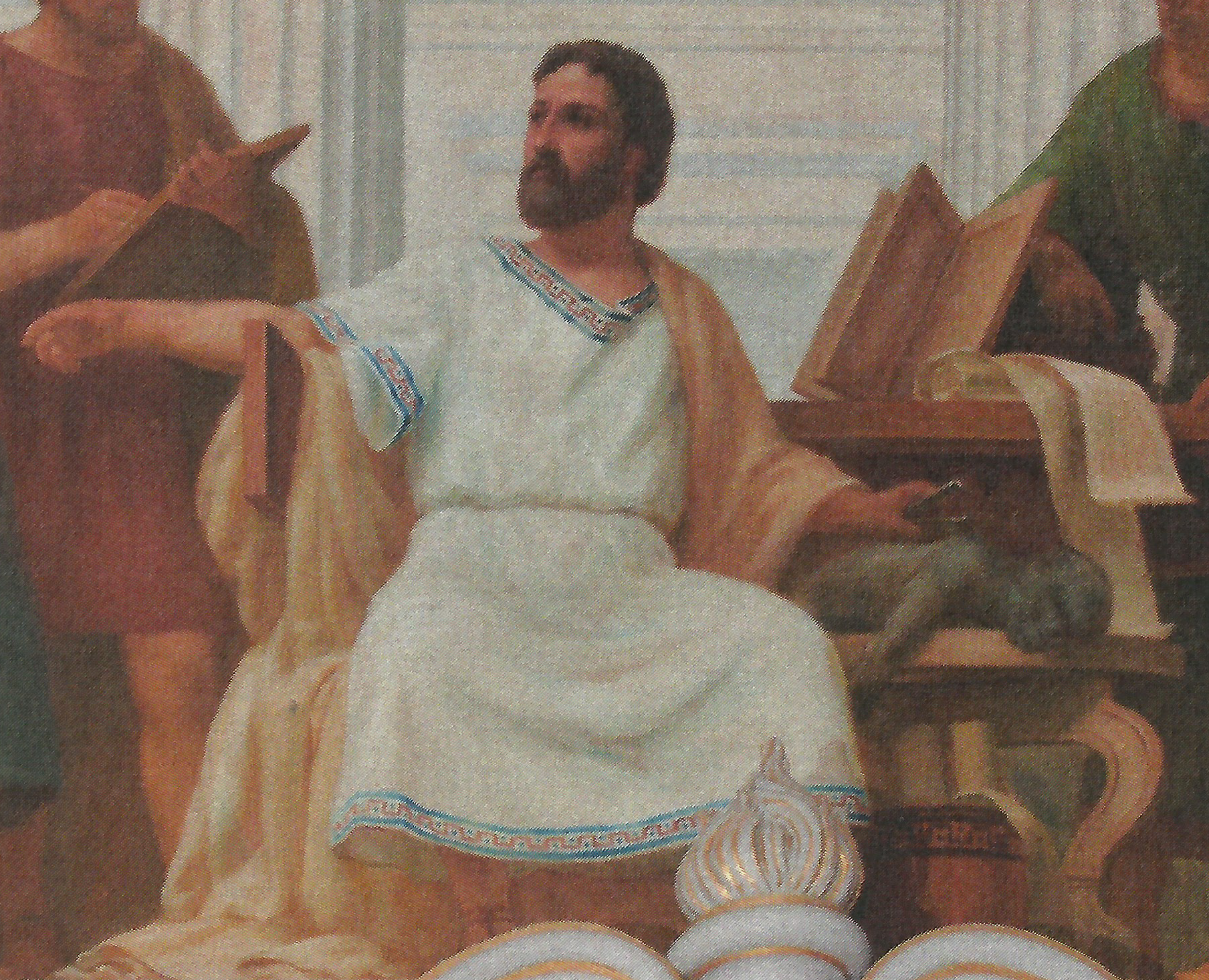
Galen dissecting a monkey, as imagined by Veloso Salgado in 1906

Galen went to Rome in 162 and made his mark as a practicing physician. His public demonstrations and impatience with alternative views on medicine brought him into conflict with other doctors practicing in the city. When the Peripatetic philosopher Eudemus became ill with quartan fever, Galen felt obliged to treat him "since he was my teacher and I happened to live nearby". He wrote: "I return to the case of Eudemus. He was thoroughly attacked by the three attacks of quartan ague, and the doctors had given him up, as it was now mid-winter." Some Roman physicians criticized Galen for his use of the prognosis in his treatment of Eudemus. This practice conflicted with the then-current standard of care, which relied upon divination and mysticism. Galen retaliated against his detractors by defending his own methods. Garcia-Ballester quotes Galen as saying: "In order to diagnose, one must observe and reason." This was the basis of his criticism of the doctors who proceeded alogos and askeptos.

However, Eudemus warned Galen that engaging in conflict with these physicians could lead to his assassination. "Eudemus said this, and more to the same effect; he added that if they were not able to harm me by unscrupulous conduct they would proceed to attempts at poisoning. Among other things he told me that, some ten years before, a young man had come to the city and had given, like me practical demonstrations of the resources of our art; this young man was put to death by poison, together with two servants who accompanied him." When Galen's animosity with the Roman medical practitioners became serious, he feared he might be exiled or poisoned, so he left the city.

Rome was engaged in foreign wars in 161; Marcus Aurelius and his then co-Emperor and adoptive brother Lucius Verus were in the north fighting the Marcomanni. During the autumn of 169 when Roman troops were returning to Aquileia, a great plague, most likely one of the first appearances of smallpox (then referred to as the Antonine Plague) in the Mediterranean world, broke out, and the emperor summoned Galen back to Rome. He was ordered to accompany Marcus and Verus to Germany as the court physician. The following spring Marcus was persuaded to release Galen after receiving a report that Asclepius was against the project. He was left behind to act as physician to the imperial heir Commodus. It was here in court that Galen wrote extensively on medical subjects. Ironically, Lucius Verus died in 169, and Marcus Aurelius himself died in 180, both victims of the plague.

Galen was the physician to Commodus for much of the emperor's life and treated his common illnesses. According to Dio Cassius 72.14.3–4, in about 189, under Commodus' reign, a pestilence occurred which at its height killed 2,000 people a day in Rome. This was most likely the same plague (the so-called "Antonine Plague" and most likely smallpox) that struck Rome during Marcus Aurelius' reign. Galen was also physician to Septimius Severus during his reign in Rome. He complimented Severus and Caracalla on keeping a supply of drugs for their friends and mentioned three cases in which they had been of use in 198.

=== The Antonine Plague ===
The Antonine Plague was named after Marcus Aurelius' family name of Antoninus. It was also known as the Plague of Galen and held an important place in medicinal history because of its association with Galen. He had first-hand knowledge of the disease, and was present in Rome when it first struck in 166, and was also present in the winter of 168–69 during an outbreak among troops stationed at Aquileia. He had experience with the epidemic, referring to it as very long lasting, and described its symptoms and his treatment of it. His references to the plague are scattered and brief. Galen was not trying to present a description of the disease so that it could be recognized in future generations; he was more interested in the treatment and physical effects of the disease. For example, in his writings about a young man afflicted with the plague, he concentrated on the treatment of internal and external ulcerations. According to Niebuhr, "this pestilence must have raged with incredible fury; it carried off innumerable victims. The ancient world never recovered from the blow inflicted upon it by the plague that visited it in the reign of M. Aurelius." The mortality rate of the plague was 7–10 percent; the outbreak in 165–168 would have caused approximately 3.5 to 5 million deaths. Otto Seeck believes that over half the population of the empire perished. J. F. Gilliam believes that the Antonine plague probably caused more deaths than any other epidemic during the empire before the mid-3rd century. Although Galen's description is incomplete, it is sufficient to enable a firm identification of the disease as related to smallpox.

Galen notes that the exanthema covered the victim's entire body and was usually black. The exanthem became rough and scabby where there was no ulceration. He states that those who were going to survive developed a black exanthem. According to Galen, it was black because of a remnant of blood putrefied in a fever blister that was pustular. His writings state that raised blisters were present in the Antonine plague, usually in the form of a blistery rash. Galen states that the skin rash was close to the one Thucydides described. Galen describes symptoms of the alimentary tract via a patient's diarrhea and stools. If the stool was very black, the patient died. He says that the amount of black stools varied. It depended on the severity of the intestinal lesions. He observes that in cases where the stool was not black, the black exanthema appeared. Galen describes the symptoms of fever, vomiting, fetid breath, catarrh, cough, and ulceration of the larynx and trachea.

=== Later years ===
Galen continued to work and write in his final years, finishing treatises on drugs and remedies as well as his compendium of diagnostics and therapeutics, which would have much influence as a medical text both in the Latin Middle Ages and Medieval Islam.

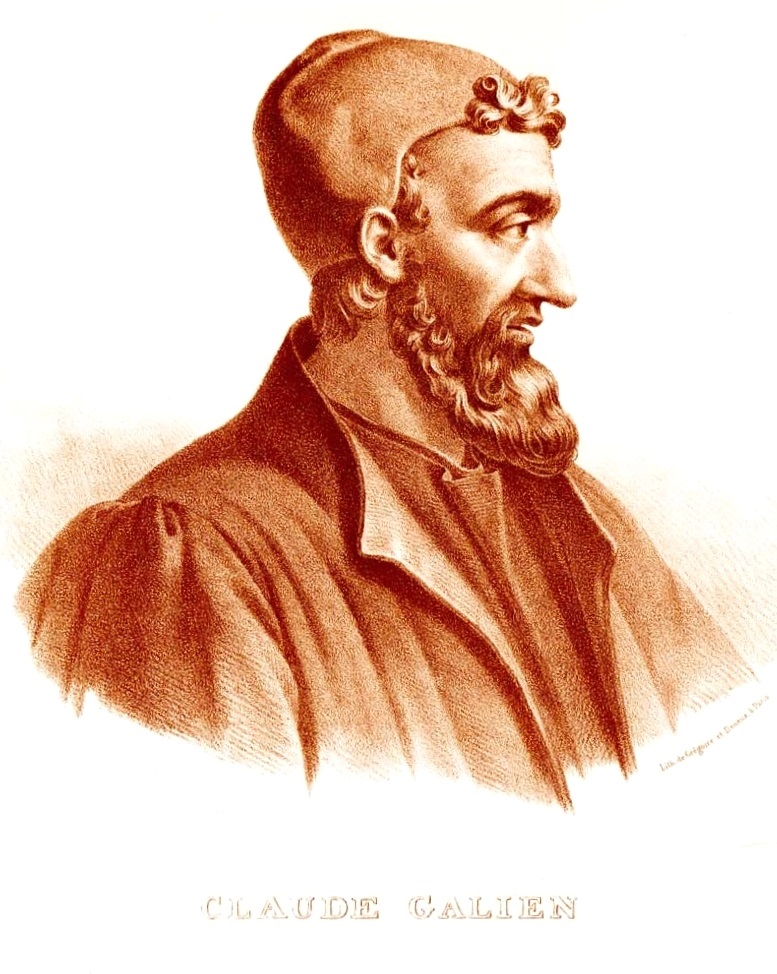
Lithograph print of Galen.

The 11th-century Suda lexicon states that Galen died at the age of 70, which would place his death in about the year 199. However, there is a reference in Galen's treatise "On Theriac to Piso" (which may, however, be spurious) to events of 204. There are also statements in Arabic sources that he died in Sicily at age 87, after 17 years studying medicine and 70 practicing it, which would mean he died about 216. According to these sources, the tomb of Galenus in Palermo was still well preserved in the tenth century. Nutton believes that "On Theriac to Piso" is genuine, that the Arabic sources are correct, and that the Suda has erroneously interpreted the 70 years of Galen's career in the Arabic tradition as referring to his whole lifespan. Boudon-Millot more or less concurs and favors a date of 216.

== Medicine ==
Galen contributed a substantial amount to the understanding of pathology. Under the Hippocratic bodily humors theory, differences in human moods come as a consequence of imbalances in one of the four bodily fluids: blood, yellow bile, black bile, and phlegm. Galen promoted this theory and the typology of human temperaments. In Galen's view, an imbalance of each humor corresponded with a particular human temperament (blood – sanguine, black bile – melancholic, yellow bile – choleric, and phlegm – phlegmatic). Thus, individuals with sanguine temperaments are extroverted and social; choleric people have energy, passion, and charisma; melancholics are creative, kind, and considerate; and phlegmatic temperaments are characterised by dependability, kindness, and affection.

Galen was also a skilled surgeon, operating on human patients. Many of his procedures and techniques would not be used again for centuries, such as the procedures he performed on brains and eyes. His surgical experiments included ligating the arteries of living animals. Although many 20th-century historians have claimed that Galen believed the lens to be in the exact center of the eye, Galen actually understood that the crystalline lens is located in the anterior aspect of the human eye.

At first reluctantly but then with increasing vigor, Galen promoted Hippocratic teaching, including venesection and bloodletting, then unknown in Rome. This was sharply criticized by the Erasistrateans, who predicted dire outcomes, believing that it was not blood but pneuma that flowed in the veins. Galen, however, staunchly defended venesection in his three books on the subject and in his demonstrations and public disputations. Galen's work on anatomy remained largely unsurpassed and unchallenged up until the 16th century in Europe. In the middle of the 16th century, the anatomist Andreas Vesalius challenged the anatomical knowledge of Galen by conducting dissections on human cadavers. These investigations allowed Vesalius to refute aspects of Galen's theories regarding anatomy.

=== Anatomy ===
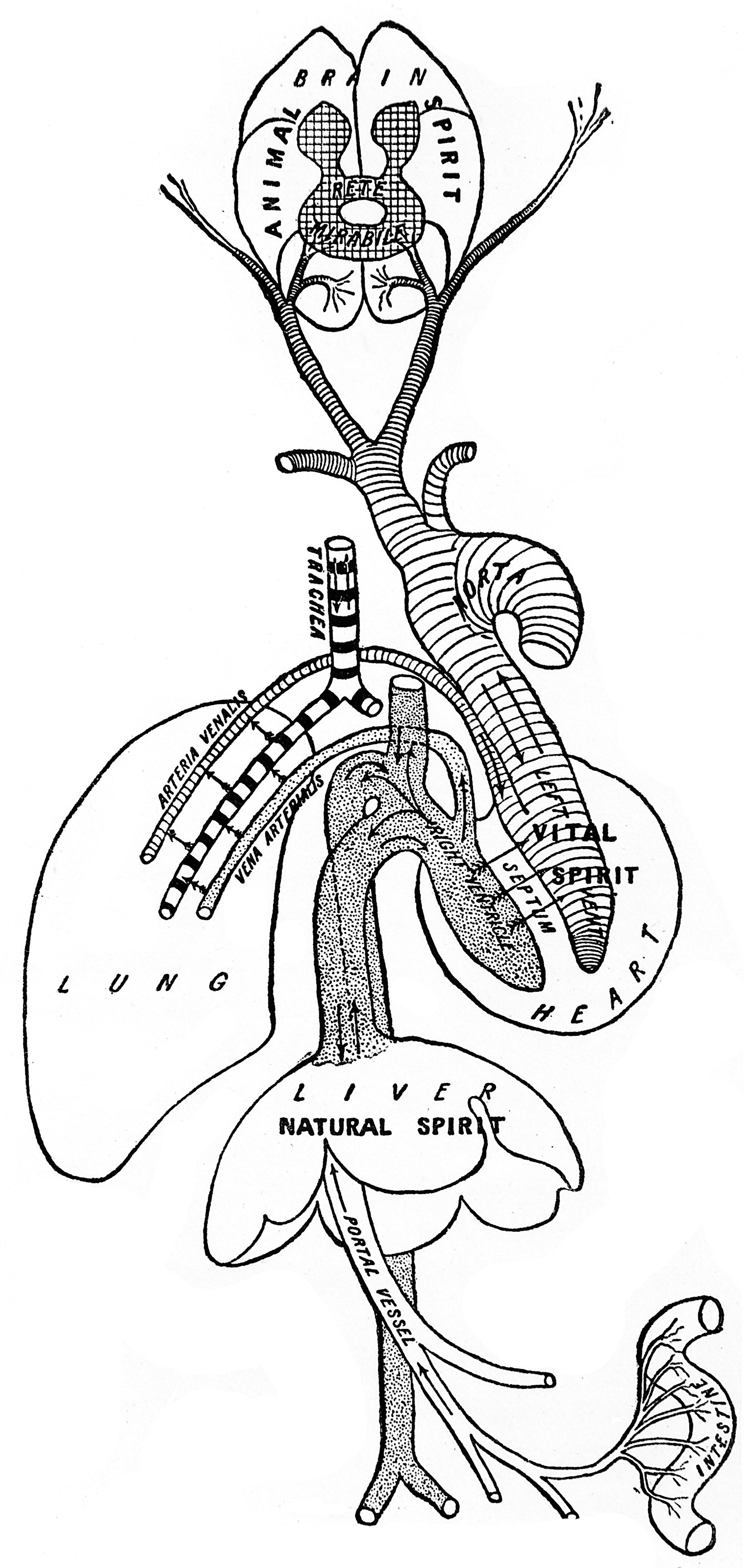
An interpretation of Galen's human "physiological system"

Galen's interest in human anatomy ran afoul of Roman law that prohibited the dissection of human cadavers since roughly 150 BC. Because of this restriction, Galen performed anatomical dissections on living (vivisection) and dead animals, mostly focusing on primates. Galen believed that the anatomical structures of these animals closely mirrored those of humans. Galen clarified the anatomy of the trachea and was the first to demonstrate that the larynx generates the voice. In one experiment, Galen used bellows to inflate the lungs of a dead animal. Galen's research on physiology was largely influenced by previous works of philosophers Plato and Aristotle, as well as from the physician Hippocrates. He was one of the first people to use experiments as a method of research for his medical findings. Doing so allowed him to explore various parts of the body and its functions.

Among Galen's major contributions to medicine was his work on the circulatory system. He was the first to recognize that there are distinct differences between venous (dark) and arterial (bright) blood. In addition to these discoveries, Galen postulated much more about the nature of the circulatory system. He believed that blood originated in the liver, which follows the teachings of Hippocrates. The liver converted nutrients gathered from ingested food into blood to be used in the circulatory system. The blood created in the liver would eventually flow unidirectionally into the right ventricle of the heart via the great vein. Galen also proposed a theory on how blood receives air from the lungs to be distributed throughout the body. He declared that the venous artery carried air from the lungs into the left ventricle of the heart to mix with created blood from the liver. This same venous artery allowed for an exchange of waste products from the blood back into the lungs to be exhaled. In order to receive air from the lungs in the left ventricle, the new blood needed to get there from the right ventricle. Thus, Galen asserted that there are small holes in the septum dividing the left and right sides of the heart; these holes allowed the blood to pass through easily to receive air and exchange the aforementioned waste products. Although his anatomical experiments on animal models led him to a more complete understanding of the circulatory system, nervous system, respiratory system, and other structures, his work contained scientific errors. Galen believed the circulatory system to consist of two separate one-way systems of distribution, rather than a single unified system of circulation. He believed venous blood to be generated in the liver, from where it was distributed and consumed by all organs of the body. He posited that arterial blood originated in the heart, from where it was distributed and consumed by all organs of the body. The blood was then regenerated in either the liver or the heart, completing the cycle. Galen also believed in the existence of a group of blood vessels he called the rete mirabile in the carotid sinus. Both of these theories of the circulation of blood were later (beginning with works of Ibn al-Nafis published c. 1242) shown to be incorrect.

Galen was also a pioneer in research about the human spine. His dissections and vivisections of animals led to key observations that helped him accurately describe the human spine, spinal cord, and vertebral column. Galen also played a major role in the discoveries of the central nervous system. He was also able to describe the nerves that emerge from the spine, which is integral to his research about the nervous system. Galen went on to be the first physician to study what happens when the spinal cord is transected on multiple different levels. He worked with pigs and studied their neuroanatomy by severing different nerves either totally or partially to see how it affected the body. He even dealt with diseases affecting the spinal cord and nerves. In his work De motu musculorum, Galen explained the difference between motor and sensory nerves, discussed the concept of muscle tone, and explained the difference between agonists and antagonists.

Galen's work on animals led to some inaccuracies, most notably his anatomy of the uterus which largely resembled a dog's. Though incorrect in his studies of human reproduction and reproductive anatomy, he came very close to identifying the ovaries as analogous to the male testes. Reproduction was a controversial topic in Galen's lifetime, as there was much debate over if the male was solely responsible for the seed, or if the woman was also responsible.

Through his vivisection practices, Galen also proved that the voice was controlled by the brain. One of the most famous experiments that he recreated in public was the squealing pig: Galen would cut open a pig, and while it was squealing he would tie off the recurrent laryngeal nerve, or vocal cords, showing they controlled the making of sound. He used the same method to tie off the ureters to prove his theories of kidney and bladder function. Galen believed the human body had three interconnected systems that allowed it to work. The first system that he theorized consisted of the brain and the nerves, responsible for thought and sensation. The second theorized system was the heart and the arteries, which Galen believed to be responsible for providing life-giving energy. The last theorized system was the liver and veins, which Galen theorized were responsible for nutrition and growth. Galen also theorized that the liver was the source of venous blood.

=== Localization of function ===
One of Galen's major works, On the Doctrines of Hippocrates and Plato, sought to demonstrate the unity of the two subjects and their views. Using their theories, combined with Aristotle's, Galen developed a tripartite soul consisting of similar aspects. He used the same terms as Plato, referring to the three parts as rational, spiritual, and appetitive. Each corresponded to a localized area of the body. The rational soul was in the brain, the spiritual soul was in the heart, and the appetitive soul was in the liver. Galen was the first scientist and philosopher to assign specific parts of the soul to locations in the body because of his extensive background in medicine, an experimental defence of the cephalocentric hypothesis against Stoic cardiocentrism. This idea is now referred to as localization of function. Galen's assignments were revolutionary for the time period, which set the precedent for future localization theories.

Galen believed each part of this tripartite soul controlled specific functions within the body and that the soul, as a whole, contributed to the health of the body, strengthening the "natural functioning capacity of the organ or organs in question". The rational soul controlled higher level cognitive functioning in an organism, for example, making choices or perceiving the world and sending those signals to the brain. He also listed "imagination, memory, recollection, knowledge, thought, consideration, voluntary motion, and sensation" as being found within the rational soul. The functions of "growing or being alive" resided in the spirited soul. The spirited soul also contained our passions, such as anger. These passions were considered to be even stronger than regular emotions, and, as a consequence, more dangerous. The third part of the soul, or the appetitive spirit, controlled the living forces in our body, most importantly blood. The appetitive spirit also regulated the pleasures of the body and was moved by feelings of enjoyment. This third part of the soul is the animalistic, or more natural, side of the soul; it deals with the natural urges of the body and survival instincts. Galen proposed that when the soul is moved by too much enjoyment, it reaches states of "incontinence" and "licentiousness", the inability to willfully cease enjoyment, which was a negative consequence of too much pleasure.

In order to unite his theories about the soul and how it operated within the body, he adapted the theory of the pneuma, which he used to explain how the soul operated within its assigned organs, and how those organs, in turn, interacted together. Galen then distinguished the vital pneuma, in the arterial system, from the psychic pneuma, in the brain and nervous system. Galen placed the vital pneuma in the heart and the psychic pneuma (spiritus animalis) within the brain. He conducted many anatomical studies on animals, most famously an ox, to study the transition from vital to psychic pneuma. Although highly criticized for comparing animal anatomy to human anatomy, Galen was convinced that his knowledge was abundant enough in both anatomies to base one on the other. In his treatise On the usefulness of the parts of the body, Galen argued that the perfect suitability of each part of the body to its function indicated the role of an intelligent creator. His creationism was anticipated by the anatomical examples of Socrates and Empedocles.

== Philosophy ==
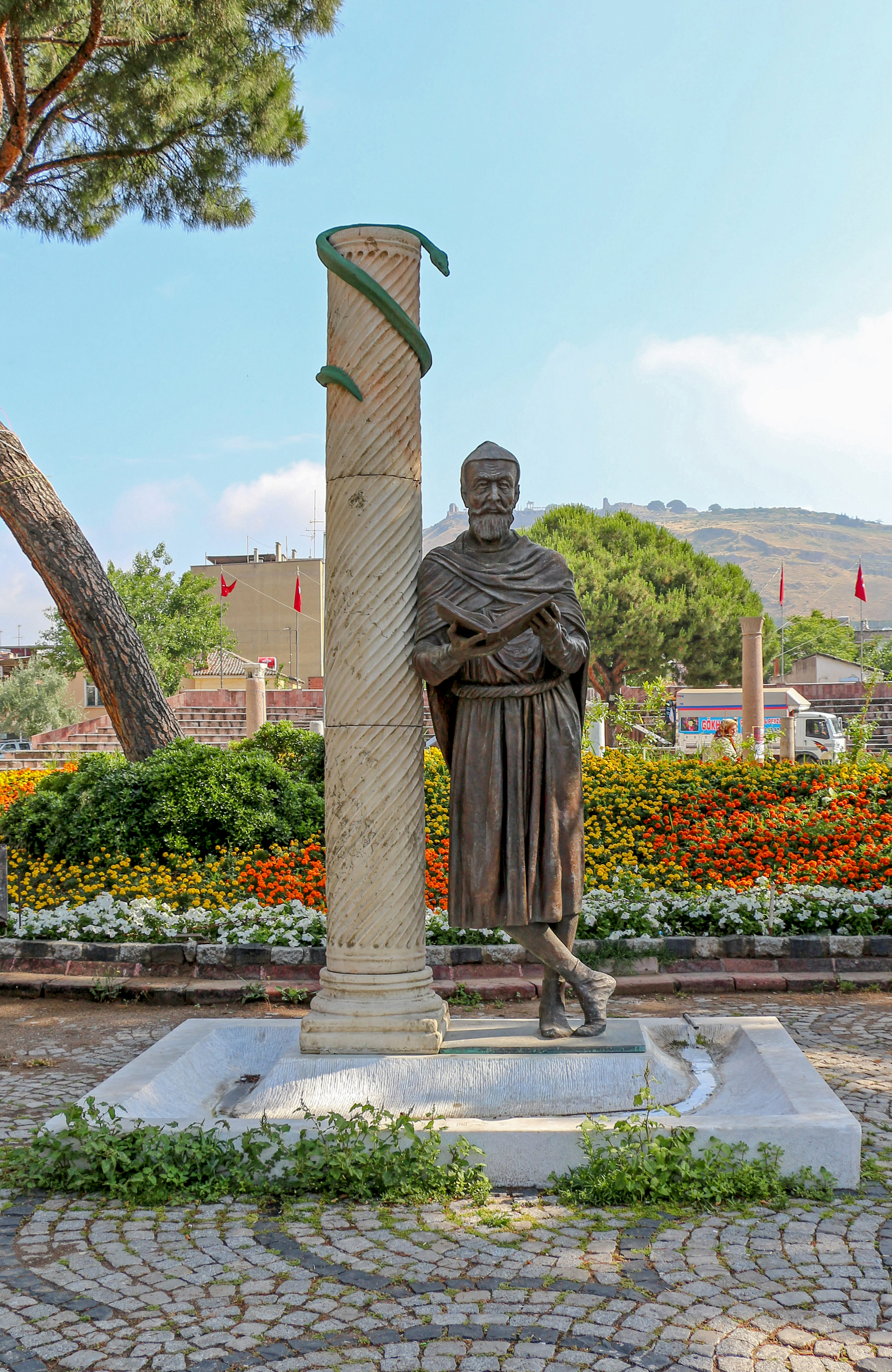
Modern statue of Galen in his home town, Pergamon

Although the main focus of his work was on medicine, anatomy, and physiology, Galen also wrote about logic and philosophy. His writings were influenced by earlier Greek and Roman thinkers, including Plato, Aristotle, the Stoics, and the Pyrrhonists. Galen was concerned to combine philosophical thought with medical practice, as in his brief work That the Best Physician is also a Philosopher he took aspects from each group and combined them with his original thought. He regarded medicine as an interdisciplinary field that was best practiced by utilizing theory, observation, and experimentation in conjunction.

Galen combined his observations of his dissections with Plato's theory about the soul. Plato believed that the body and the soul were separate entities, rivaling the Stoics. Plato proclaimed that the soul is immortal, so it must exist before one is born, beyond the human body. This influenced Galen's thinking that the soul had to be acquired because the soul does not always reside within the human body. Plato's influence in Galen's model showed itself most prominently in what Galen dubbed arterial blood, which is a mixture of nutritious blood from the liver and the vital spirit (the soul) which was attained from the lungs. The vital spirit within this medium was necessary for the body to function and eventually completely absorbed. This process was then repeated indefinitely, according to Galen, so that the body could be replenished with the soul, or the vital spirit.

Several schools of thought existed within the medical field during Galen's lifetime, the main two being the Empiricists and Rationalists (also called Dogmatists or Philosophers), with the Methodists being a smaller group. The Empiricists emphasized the importance of physical practice and experimentation or "active learning" in the medical discipline. In direct opposition to the Empiricists were the Rationalists, who valued the study of established teachings in order to create new theories in the name of medical advancements. The Methodists formed somewhat of a middle ground, as they were not as experimental as the Empiricists, nor as theoretical as the Rationalists. The Methodists mainly utilized pure observation, showing greater interest in studying the natural course of ailments than making efforts to find remedies. Galen's education had exposed him to the five major schools of thought (Platonists, Peripatetics, Stoics, Epicureans, Pyrrhonists), with teachers from the Rationalist sect and from the Empiricist sect.

=== Opposition to the Stoics ===
Galen was well known for his advancements in medicine and the circulatory system, but he was also concerned with philosophy. He developed his own tripartite soul model following the examples of Plato; some scholars refer to him as a Platonist. Galen developed a theory of personality based on his understanding of fluid circulation in humans, and he believed that there was a physiological basis for mental disorders. Galen connected many of his theories to the pneuma and he opposed the Stoics' definition of and use of the pneuma.

The Stoics, according to Galen, failed to give a credible answer for the localization of functions of the psyche, or the mind. Through his use of medicine, he was convinced that he came up with a better answer, the brain. The Stoics only recognized the soul as having one part, which was the rational soul and they claimed it would be found in the heart. Galen, following Plato's idea, came up with two more parts to the soul.

Galen also rejected Stoic propositional logic and instead embraced a hypothetical syllogistic which was strongly influenced by the Peripatetics and based on elements of Aristotelian logic.

== Psychology ==
=== Mind–body problem ===
Galen believed there is no sharp distinction between the mental and the physical. This was a controversial argument at the time, and Galen agreed with some Greek philosophical schools in believing that the mind and body were not separate faculties. He believed that this could be scientifically shown. This was where his opposition to the Stoics became most prevalent. Galen proposed organs within the body to be responsible for specific functions. According to Galen, the Stoics' lack of scientific justification discredited their claims of the separateness of mind and body, which is why he spoke so strongly against them. There is an intense scholarly debate about soul–body relations in Galen's psychological writings. In his brief treatise Quod animi mores, Galen says both that the soul "follows" the mixtures of the body, and that the soul is a bodily mixture. Scholars have offered ways of reconciling these claims, arguing for a materialist reading of Galen's philosophy of mind. According to this materialist reading, Galen identifies the soul with the mixtures of the body.

=== Psychotherapy ===
Another one of Galen's major works, On the Diagnosis and Cure of the Soul's Passion, discussed how to approach and treat psychological problems. This was Galen's early attempt at what would later be called psychotherapy. His book contained directions on how to provide counsel to those with psychological issues to prompt them to reveal their deepest passions and secrets, and eventually cure them of their mental deficiency. The leading individual, or therapist, had to be a male, preferably of an older, wiser, age, as well as free from the control of the passions. These passions, according to Galen, caused the psychological problems that people experienced.

== Published works ==
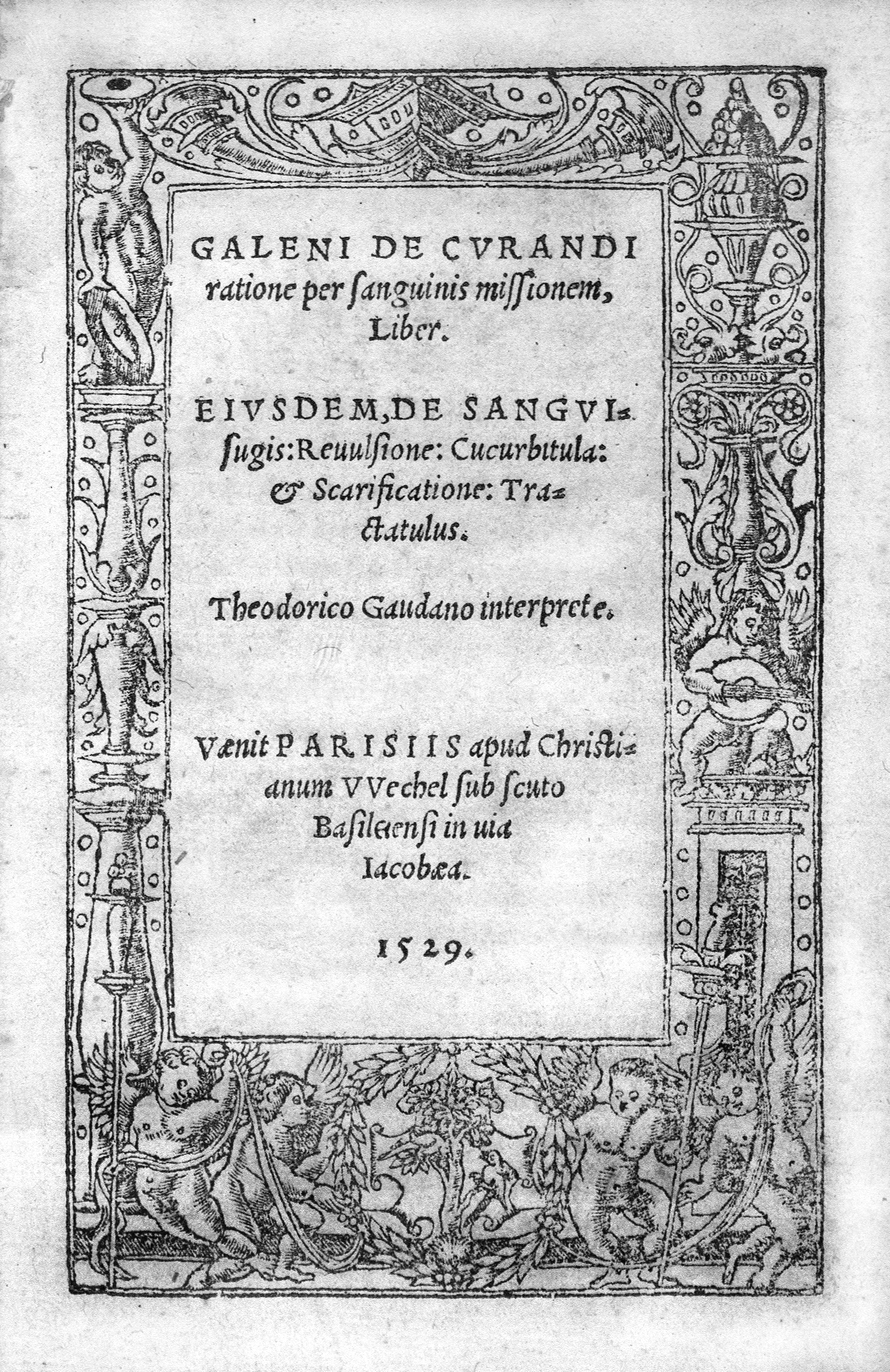
De curandi ratione

Galen may have produced more work than any author in antiquity, rivaling the quantity of work issued from Augustine of Hippo. So profuse was Galen's output that the surviving texts represent nearly half of all the extant literature from ancient Greece. It has been reported that Galen employed twenty scribes to write down his words. Galen may have written as many as 500 treatises, amounting to some 10 million words. Although his surviving works amount to some 3 million words, this is thought to represent less than a third of his complete writings. In 191, or more likely in 192, a fire in the Temple of Peace destroyed many of his works, in particular treatises on philosophy.

Because Galen's works were not translated into Latin in the ancient period, and because of the collapse of the Roman Empire in the West, the study of Galen, along with the Greek medical tradition as a whole, went into decline in Western Europe during the Early Middle Ages, when very few Latin scholars could read Greek. However, in general, Galen and the ancient Greek medical tradition continued to be studied and followed in the Eastern Roman Empire, commonly known as the Byzantine Empire. All of the extant Greek manuscripts of Galen were copied by Byzantine scholars.

In the Abbasid period (after 750) Arab Muslims began to be interested in Greek scientific and medical texts for the first time, and had some of Galen's texts translated into Arabic, often by Syrian Christian scholars (see below). As a result, some texts of Galen exist only in Arabic translation, while others exist only in medieval Latin translations of the Arabic. In some cases scholars have even attempted to translate from the Latin or Arabic back into Greek where the original is lost. For some of the ancient sources, such as Herophilus, Galen's account of their work is all that survives.

Even in his own time, forgeries and unscrupulous editions of his work were a problem, prompting him to write On His Own Books. Forgeries in Latin, Arabic or Greek continued until the Renaissance. Some of Galen's treatises have appeared under many different titles over the years. Sources are often in obscure and difficult-to-access journals or repositories. Although written in Greek, by convention the works are referred to by Latin titles, and often by merely abbreviations of those. No single authoritative collection of his work exists, and controversy remains as to the authenticity of a number of works attributed to Galen. As a consequence, research on Galen's work is fraught with hazard.

Various attempts have been made to classify Galen's vast output. For instance Coxe (1846) lists a Prolegomena, or introductory books, followed by 7 classes of treatise embracing Physiology (28 vols.), Hygiene (12), Aetiology (19), Semeiotics (14), Pharmacy (10), Blood letting (4), and Therapeutics (17), in addition to 4 of aphorisms, and spurious works. The most complete compendium of Galen's writings, surpassing even modern projects like the Corpus Medicorum Graecorum/Latinorum, is the one compiled and translated by Karl Gottlob Kühn of Leipzig between 1821 and 1833. This collection consists of 122 of Galen's treatises, translated from the original Greek into Latin (the text is presented in both languages). Over 20,000 pages in length, it is divided into 22 volumes, with 676 index pages. Many of Galen's works are included in the Thesaurus Linguae Graecae, a digital library of Greek literature started in 1972.

== Legacy ==
=== Late antiquity ===
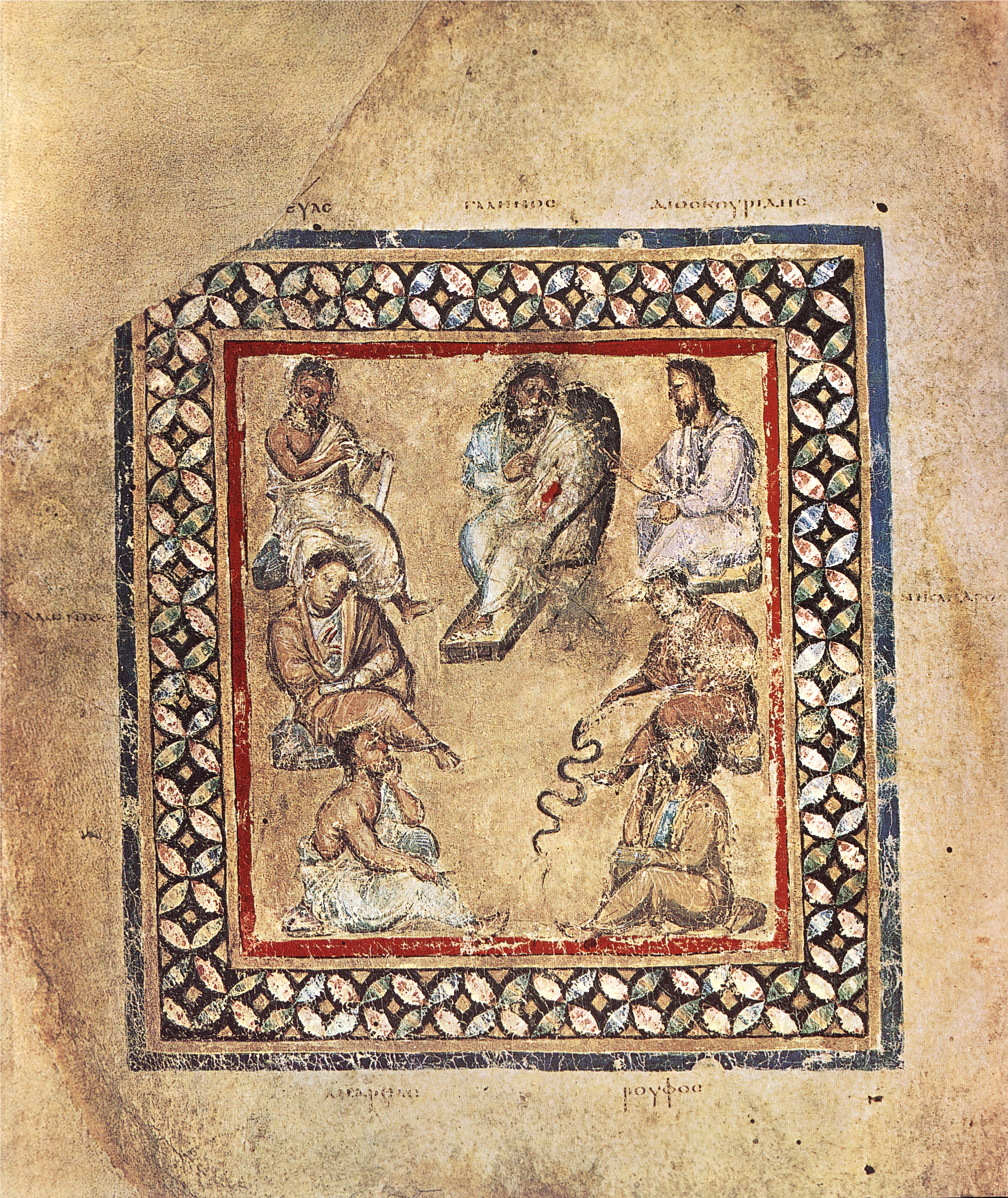
A group of physicians in an image from the Vienna Dioscurides; Galen is depicted top center.

In his time, Galen's reputation as both physician and philosopher was legendary, the emperor Marcus Aurelius describing him as "Primum sane medicorum esse, philosophorum autem solum" (first among doctors and unique among philosophers Praen 14: 660). Other contemporary authors in the Greek world confirm this including Theodotus the Shoemaker, Athenaeus and Alexander of Aphrodisias. The 7th-century poet George of Pisida went so far as to refer to Christ as a second and neglected Galen. Galen continued to exert an important influence over the theory and practice of medicine until the mid-17th century in the Byzantine and Arabic worlds and Europe. A few centuries after Galen, Palladius Iatrosophista stated in his commentary on Hippocrates that Hippocrates sowed and Galen reaped.

Galen summarized and synthesized the work of his predecessors, and it is in Galen's words (Galenism) that Greek medicine was handed down to subsequent generations, such that Galenism became the means by which Greek medicine was known to the world. Often, this was in the form of restating and reinterpreting, such as in Magnus of Nisibis' 4th-century work on urine, which was in turn translated into Arabic. Yet the full importance of his contributions was not appreciated until long after his death. Galen's rhetoric and prolificity were so powerful as to convey the impression that there was little left to learn. The term Galenism has subsequently taken on both a positive and pejorative meaning as one that transformed medicine in late antiquity yet so dominated subsequent thinking as to stifle further progress.

After the collapse of the Western Empire the study of Galen and other Greek works almost disappeared in the Latin West. In contrast, in the predominantly Greek-speaking eastern half of the Roman empire (Byzantium), many commentators of the subsequent centuries, such as Oribasius, physician to the emperor Julian who compiled a Synopsis in the 4th century, preserved and disseminated Galen's works, making them more accessible. Nutton refers to these authors as the "medical refrigerators of antiquity". In late antiquity, medical writing veered increasingly in the direction of the theoretical at the expense of the practical, with many authors merely debating Galenism. Magnus of Nisibis was a pure theorist, as were John of Alexandria and Agnellus of Ravenna with their lectures on Galen's De Sectis. So strong was Galenism that other authors such as Hippocrates began to be seen through Galen's eyes, while his opponents became marginalised and other medical sects such as Asclepiadism slowly disappeared.

Greek medicine was part of Greek culture, and Syrian Christians came in contact with it while the Eastern Roman Empire (Byzantium) ruled Syria and western Mesopotamia, regions that were conquered in the 7th century by the Arabs. After 750, these Syrian Christians made the first translations of Galen into Syriac and Arabic. From then on, Galen and the Greek medical tradition in general became assimilated into the medieval and early modern Islamic Middle East. Job of Edessa is said to have translated 36 of Galen's works into Syriac, some of which were later translated into Arabic by Hunain ibn Ishaq.

=== Medieval Islam ===
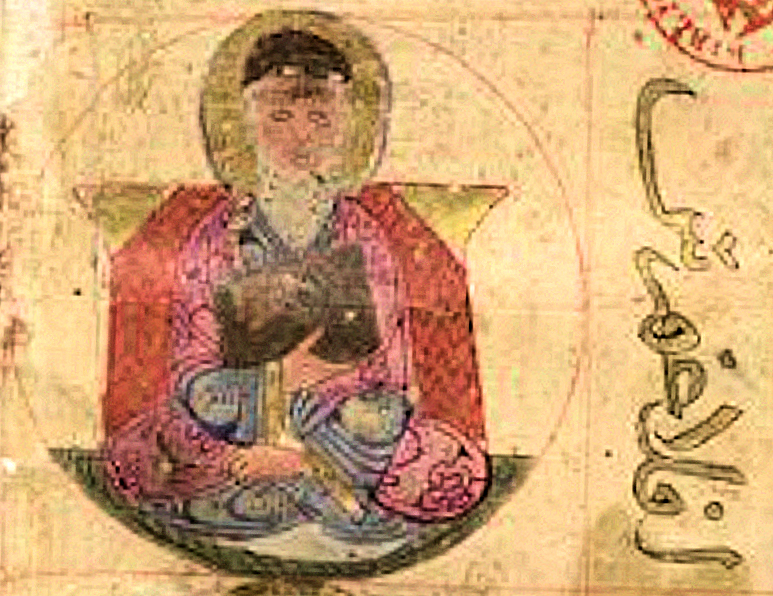
Galen (Arabic: جالينوس, romanized: Jalinus) in Kitab al-Dariyak, 1225–1250, Syria. Vienna AF 10, Syria.

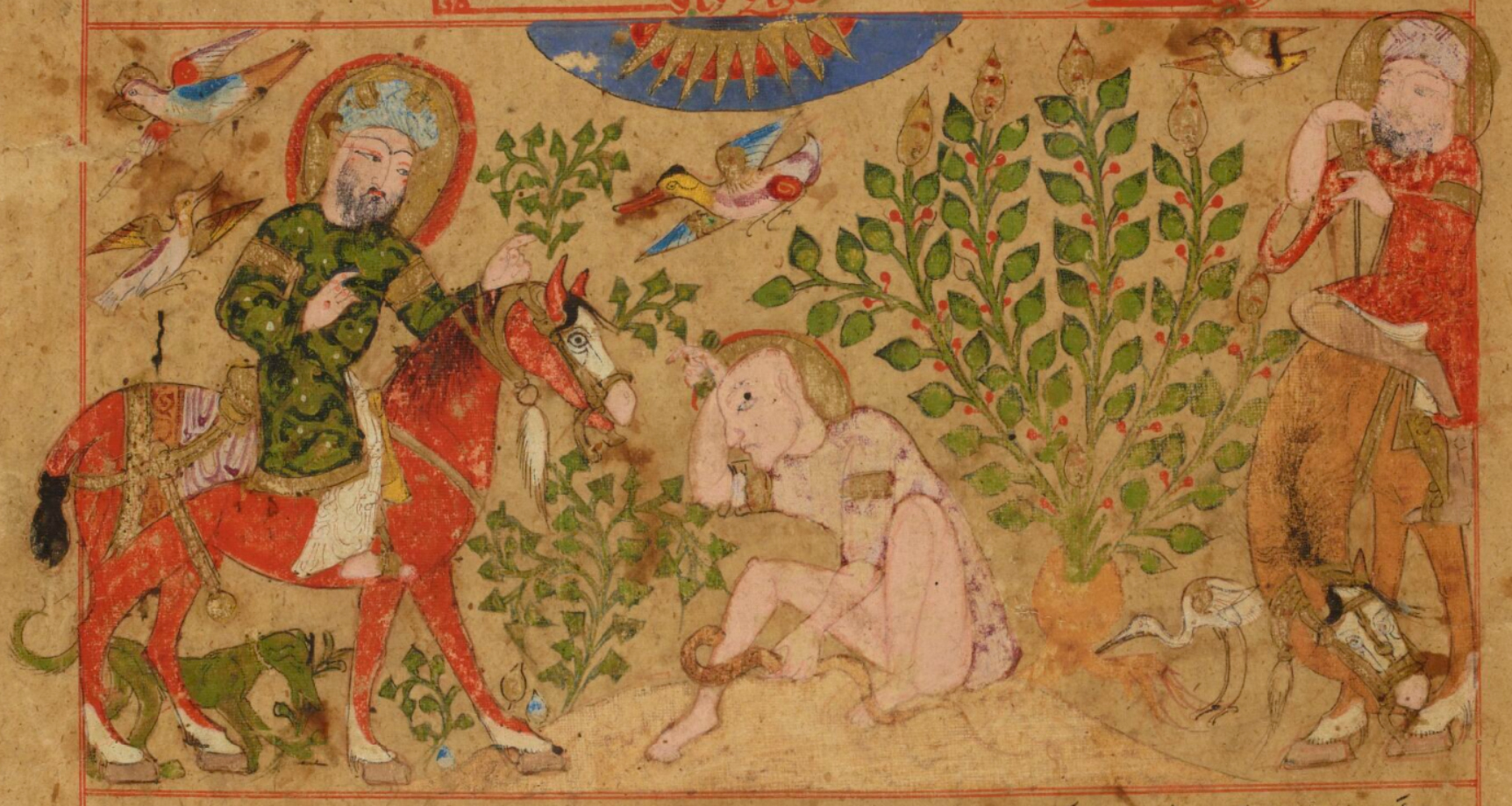
The Kitab al-Dariyak was allegedly based on the work of Galen. Here, Andromachus the Elder on horseback, questioning a patient who has received a snake bite. Kitab al-Dariyak, 1198–1199, Syria.

Galen's approach to medicine became and remains influential in the Islamic world. The first major translator of Galen into Arabic was the Arab Christian Hunayn ibn Ishaq. He translated (c. 830–870) 129 works of "Jalinos" into Arabic. Arabic sources, such as Muhammad ibn Zakarīya al-Rāzi (AD 865–925), continue to be the source of discovery of new or relatively inaccessible Galenic writings. One of Hunayn's Arabic translations, Kitab ila Aglooqan fi Shifa al Amrad, which is extant in the Library of Ibn Sina Academy of Medieval Medicine & Sciences, is regarded as a masterpiece of Galen's literary works. A part of the Alexandrian compendium of Galen's work, this 10th-century manuscript comprises two parts that include details regarding various types of fevers (Humyat) and different inflammatory conditions of the body. More important is that it includes details of more than 150 single and compound formulations of both herbal and animal origin. The book provides an insight into understanding the traditions and methods of treatment in the Greek and Roman eras. In addition, this book provides a direct source for the study of more than 150 single and compound drugs used during the Greco-Roman period.

As the title of Doubts on Galen by al-Rāzi implies, as well as the writings of physicians such as Ibn Zuhr and Ibn al-Nafis, the works of Galen were not accepted unquestioningly, but as a challengeable basis for further inquiry. A strong emphasis on experimentation and empiricism led to new results and new observations, which were contrasted and combined with those of Galen by writers such as al-Rāzi, Ali ibn Abbas al-Majusi, Abu al-Qasim al-Zahrawi, Ibn Sina (Avicenna), Ibn Zuhr, and Ibn al-Nafis. For example, Ibn al-Nafis' discovery of the pulmonary circulation contradicted the Galenic theory on the heart.

The influence of Galen's writings, including humorism, remains strong in modern Unani medicine, now closely identified with Islamic culture, and widely practiced from India (where it is officially recognized) to Morocco. Maimonides was influenced by Galen, whom he cited most often in his medical works, and whom he considered to be the greatest physician of all time. In India many Hindu physicians studied Persian and Urdu languages and learnt Galenic medicine. This trend of studies among Hindu physicians began in the 17th century and lasted until the early 20th century (Speziale 2018).

=== Middle Ages ===
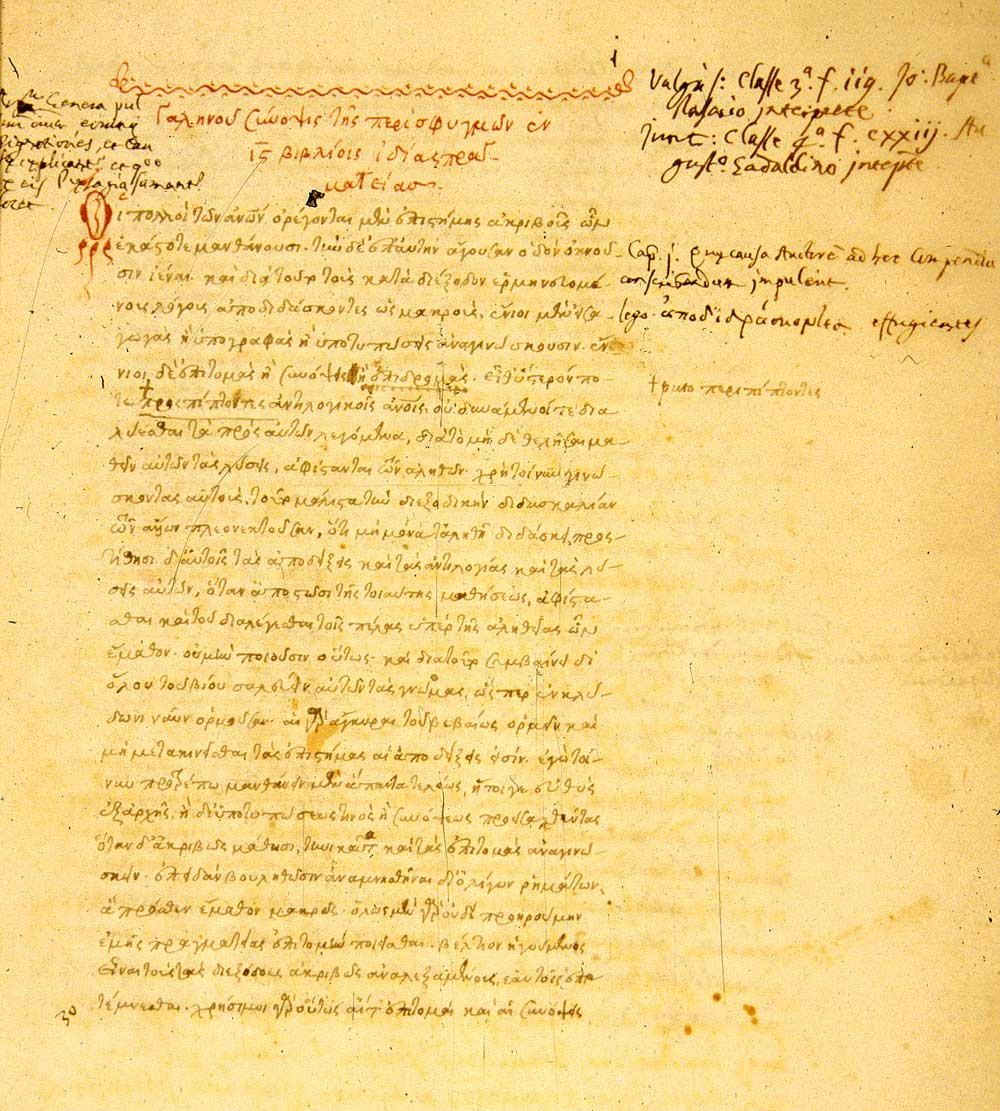
De Pulsibus (c. 1550), Galen's treatise on the pulse, in Greek and Latin

From the 11th century onwards, Latin translations of Islamic medical texts began to appear in the West, alongside the Salerno school of thought, and were soon incorporated into the curriculum at the universities of Naples and Montpellier. From that time, Galenism took on a new, unquestioned authority, Galen even being referred to as the "Medical Pope of the Middle Ages". Constantine the African was amongst those who translated both Hippocrates and Galen from Arabic. In addition to the more numerous translations of Arabic texts in this period, there were a few translations of Galenic works directly from the Greek, such as Burgundio of Pisa's translation of De complexionibus. Galen's works on anatomy and medicine became the mainstay of the medieval physician's university curriculum, alongside Ibn Sina's The Canon of Medicine, which elaborated on Galen's works. Unlike pagan Rome, Christian Europe did not exercise a universal prohibition of the dissection and autopsy of the human body and such examinations were carried out regularly from at least the 13th century. However, Galen's influence was so great that when dissections discovered anomalies compared with Galen's anatomy, the physicians often tried to fit these into the Galenic system. An example of this is Mondino de Liuzzi, who describes rudimentary blood circulation in his writings but still asserts that the left ventricle should contain air. Some cited these changes as proof that human anatomy had changed since the time of Galen.

The most important translator of Galen's works into Latin was Niccolò di Deoprepio da Reggio, who spent several years working on Galen. Niccolò worked at the Angevin Court during the reign of king Robert of Naples. Among Niccolò's translations is a piece from a medical treatise by Galen, of which the original text is lost.

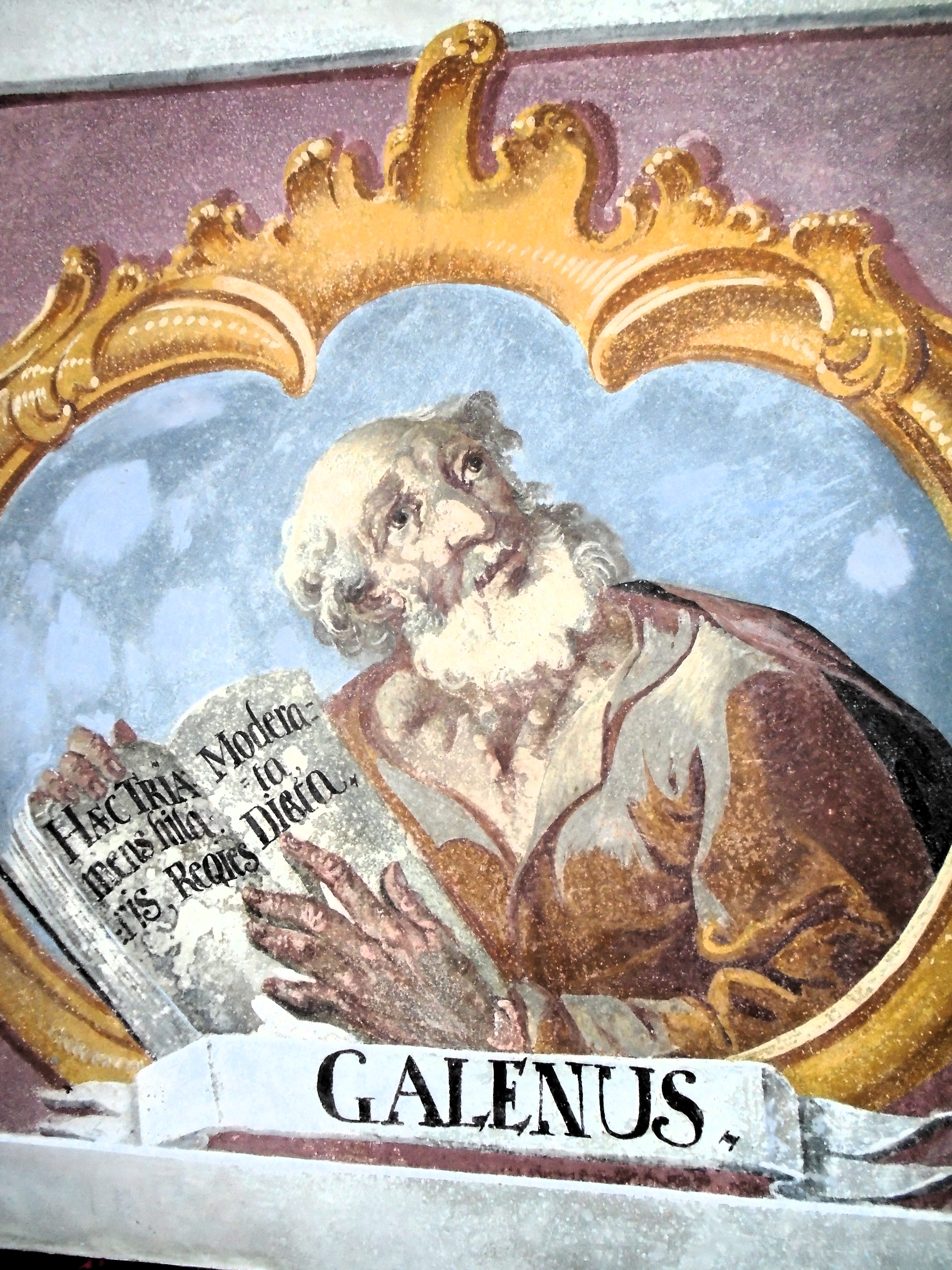
Wall painting of Galen in Franciscan Monastery in Olimje, Slovenia

=== Renaissance ===
The first edition of Galen's complete works in Latin translation was edited by Diomede Bonardo of Brescia and printed at Venice by Filippo Pinzi in 1490.

The Renaissance, and the fall of the Byzantine Empire (1453), were accompanied by an influx of Greek scholars and manuscripts to the West, allowing direct comparison between the Arabic commentaries and the original Greek texts of Galen. This New Learning and the Humanist movement, particularly the work of Linacre, promoted literae humaniores including Galen in the Latin scientific canon, De Naturalibus Facultatibus appearing in London in 1523. Debates on medical science now had two traditions, the more conservative Arabian and the liberal Greek. The more extreme liberal movements began to challenge the role of authority in medicine, as exemplified by Paracelsus' symbolically burning the works of Avicenna and Galen at his medical school in Basel. Nevertheless, Galen's pre-eminence amongst the great thinkers of the millennium is exemplified by a 16th-century mural in the refectory of the Great Lavra of Mount Athos. It depicts pagan sages at the foot of the Tree of Jesse, with Galen between the Sibyl and Aristotle.

Galenism's final defeat came from a combination of the negativism of Paracelsus and the constructivism of the Italian Renaissance anatomists, such as Vesalius in the 16th century. In the 1530s, the Flemish anatomist and physician Andreas Vesalius took on a project to translate many of Galen's Greek texts into Latin. Vesalius' most famous work, De humani corporis fabrica, was greatly influenced by Galenic writing and form. Seeking to examine critically Galen's methods and outlook, Vesalius turned to human cadaver dissection as a means of verification. Galen's writings were shown by Vesalius to describe details present in monkeys but not in humans, and he demonstrated Galen's limitations through books and hands-on demonstrations despite fierce opposition from orthodox pro-Galenists such as Jacobus Sylvius. Since Galen states that he is using observations of monkeys (human dissection was prohibited) to give an account of what the body looks like, Vesalius could portray himself as using Galen's approach of description of direct observation to create a record of the exact details of the human body, since he worked in a time when human dissection was allowed. Galen argued that monkey anatomy was close enough to humans for physicians to learn anatomy with monkey dissections and then make observations of similar structures in the wounds of their patients, rather than trying to learn anatomy only from wounds in human patients, as would be done by students trained in the Empiricist model. The examinations of Vesalius also disproved medical theories of Aristotle and Mondino de Liuzzi. One of the best known examples of Vesalius' overturning of Galenism was his demonstration that the interventricular septum of the heart was not permeable, as Galen had taught (Nat Fac III xv). However, this had been revealed two years before by Michael Servetus in his fateful "Christianismi restitutio" (1553) with only three copies of the book surviving, but these remained hidden for decades; the rest were burned shortly after its publication because of persecution of Servetus by religious authorities.

Michael Servetus, using the name "Michel de Villeneuve" during his stay in France, was Vesalius' fellow student and the best Galenist at the University of Paris, according to Johann Winter von Andernach, who taught both. In the Galenism of the Renaissance, editions of the Opera Omnia by Galen were very important, beginning from the Aldine Press' editio princeps in Venice in 1525. It was followed in Venice in 1541–1542 by the Giunta. There were fourteen editions of the book from that date until 1625. Just one edition was produced from Lyon between 1548 and 1551. The Lyon edition has commentaries on breathing and blood streaming that correct the work of earlier renowned authors such as Vesalius, Caius, or Janus Cornarius. "Michel De Villeneuve" had contracts with Jean Frellon for that work, and the Servetus scholar-researcher Francisco Javier González Echeverría presented research that became an accepted communication in the International Society for the History of Medicine, which concluded that Michael De Villeneuve (Michael Servetus) is the author of the commentaries of this edition of Frellon, in Lyon.

Another convincing case where understanding of the body was extended beyond where Galen had left it came from these demonstrations of the nature of human circulation and the subsequent work of Andrea Cesalpino, Fabricio of Acquapendente, and William Harvey. Some Galenic teaching, such as his emphasis on bloodletting as a remedy for many ailments, however, remained influential until well into the 19th century.

=== Contemporary scholarship ===
Galenic scholarship remains an intense and vibrant field, with interest in Galen's work bolstered by the German encyclopedia Realencyclopädie der Classischen Altertumswissenschaft.

Copies of his works translated by Robert M. Green are held at the National Library of Medicine in Bethesda, Maryland.

In 2018, the University of Basel discovered that a mysterious Greek papyrus with mirror writing on both sides, which is in the collection of Basilius Amerbach, a professor of jurisprudence at the university in the 16th century, is an unknown medical document of Galen or an unknown commentary on his work. The medical text describes the phenomenon of "hysterical apnea".

== See also ==
- Abascantus
- Galen crater, a lunar formation named him
- Galenic formulation
- Galenic corpus
- History of medicine
- Timeline of medicine and medical technology
- Peri Alypias

== Sources ==
The works of Galen are listed in Galenic corpus.

- Algra K (ed.) The Cambridge History of Hellenistic Philosophy. Cambridge University Press, 2005. ISBN 978-90-04-35275-9
- Nutton, Vivian (1 January 2008). "Book Review: Galien: Introduction générale; Sur l'ordre de ses propres livres; Sur ses propres livres; Que l'excellent médecin est aussi philosophe". Medical History. 52 (1): 144–145. doi:10.1017/S0025727300002209. PMC 2175042.
- Brodersen K. Galenos, Die verbrannte Bibliothek: Peri Alypias. Marix, Wiesbaden 2015, ISBN 978-3-7374-0962-9
- Debru A. "Galen on Pharmacology: Philosophy, History, and Medicine : Proceedings of the Vth International Galen Colloquium", Lille, 16–18 March 1995 Brill, 1997, ISBN 978-90-04-10403-7
- Dunn PM. Galen (AD 129–200) of Pergamun: anatomist and experimental physiologist. Arch Dis Child Fetal Neonatal Ed. 2003 Sep;88(5):F441–443.
- Everson S. (ed.) Language. Cambridge University Press, 1994, ISBN 978-0-521-35795-1
- French RK. Medicine Before Science: The Rational and Learned Doctor from the Middle Ages to the Enlightenment. Cambridge University Press, 2003. ISBN 978-0-521-00761-0
- Gleason, MW (January 2007). "Shock and Awe: The Performance Dimension of Galen's Anatomy Demonstrations Version 5" (PDF). Princeton/Stanford Working Papers in Classics. Archived from the original (PDF) on 31 May 2022.
- Gleason MW. Making Men: Sophists and Self-Presentation in Ancient Rome. Princeton 1995
- Hankinson RJ (ed.) The Cambridge Companion to Galen. CUP 2008 ISBN 978-0-521-81954-1
- Hankinson R.J. Cause and explanation in ancient Greek thought. Oxford University Press, 1998, ISBN 978-0-19-924656-4
- Houston, George W. (2003). "Galen, His Books, and the Horrea Piperataria at Rome". Memoirs of the American Academy in Rome. 48. University of Michigan Press: 45–51. doi:10.2307/4238804. JSTOR 4238804.
- Johannes Ilberg. "Aus Galens Praxis. Neue Jahrbücher für das Klassische Altertum", Geschichte und Deutsche Literatur 15: 276–312, 1905
- Hakim Syed Zillur Rahman (ed.). Jawami Kitab Al-Nabd Al-Saghir by Galen (2007), Ibn Sina Academy of Medieval Medicine & Sciences, Aligarh, India; ISBN 978-81-901362-7-3
- Hakim Syed Zillur Rahman (ed.). Kitab fi Firaq al Tibb by Galen (2008), Ibn Sina Academy of Medieval Medicine & Sciences, Aligarh, India; ISBN 978-81-906070-1-8
- Hakim Syed Zillur Rahman (ed.). Kitab al Anasir by Galen (2008), Ibn Sina Academy of Medieval Medicine & Sciences, Aligarh, India; ISBN 978-81-906070-2-5
- Hakim Syed Zillur Rahman (ed.). Kitab al Mizaj of Galen (2008), Ibn Sina Academy of Medieval Medicine & Sciences, Aligarh, India, ISBN 978-81-906070-3-2
- Kotrc RF, Walters KR. "A bibliography of the Galenic Corpus. A newly researched list and arrangement of the titles of the treatises extant in Greek, Latin, and Arabic". Trans Stud Coll Physicians Phila. 1979 December;1(4):256–304
- Mattern SP. Physicians and the Roman Imperial Aristocracy: The Patronage of Therapeutics. Bulletin of the History of Medicine. Volume 73, Number 1, Spring 1999, pp. 1–18
- Metzger BM. New Testament Studies: Philological, Versional, and Patristic. Brill, 1980, ISBN 978-90-04-06163-7
- Muhaqqiq M. Medical Sects in Islam. al-Tawhid Islamic Journal, vol. VIII, No.2
- Nutton V. "Roman Medicine, 250 BC to AD 200, and Medicine in Late Antiquity and the Early Middle Ages", in Lawrence C.(ed.) The Western Medical Tradition: 800–1800 A.D. 1995
- Nutton V. Ancient Medicine. Routledge, 2004, ISBN 978-0-415-08611-0
- Osler W. The Evolution of Modern Medicine 1913. Plain Label Books 1987. Chapter II: Greek Medicine
- Peterson DW. "Observations on the chronology of the Galenic Corpus". Bull Hist Med 51(3): 484, 1977
- Siegel RE. Galen's System of Physiology and Medicine, Basel 1968 (this text is not regarded highly by most Galen scholars)
- Siegel RE. Galen on Sense Perception, His Doctrines, Observations and Experiments on Vision, Hearing, Smell, Taste, Touch and Pain, and Their Historical Sources. Karger, Basel 1970 (this text is not regarded highly by most Galen scholars)
- Siegel RE. Galen on Psychology, Psychopathology, and Function and Diseases of the Nervous System 1973 (this text is not regarded highly by most Galen scholars)
- Smith WG. Dictionary of Greek and Roman Biography and Mythology. J Walton 1849
- Stakelum JW, Galen and the Logic of Proposition, Rome, Angelicum, 1940
- Taylor HO. Greek Biology And Medicine. Marshall Jones 1922. Chapter 5: The Final System – Galen
- Temkin O. Galenism: Rise and Decline of a Medical Philosophy. Cornell University Press, Ithaca 1973
- The Cambridge Ancient History: Second Edition. XI The High Empire A.D. 70–192 Cambridge University Press, 2000, ISBN 978-0-521-26335-1
- Thesaurus Linguae Graecae: TLG
- van der Eijk P. Medicine and Philosophy in Classical Antiquity: Doctors and Philosophers on Nature, Soul, Health and Disease. Cambridge University Press, 2005, ISBN 978-0-521-81800-1
- Watson PB. Marcus Aurelius Antoninus. Harper & brothers, 1884
