= Acron =

Ancient Greek physician

- Ἄκρων
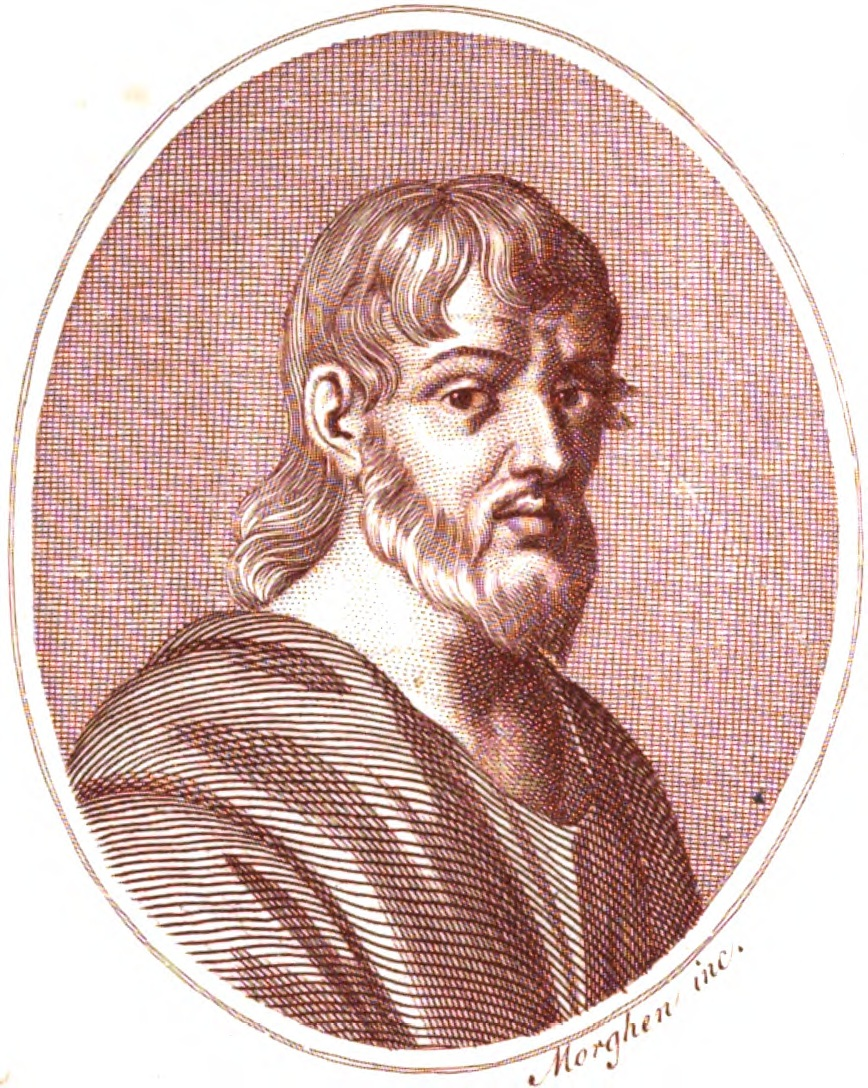
- Born: 5th century BC; Agrigentum (Acragas), Magna Graecia
- Occupations: Physician, philosopher
- Relatives: Xenon
- Medical career
- Field: Ancient Greek medicine
- Notable works: On Medicine (lost), On the Food of Healthy People (lost)

Acron (Ancient Greek: Ἄκρων), son of Xenon, was a Greek physician born at Agrigentum in Magna Graecia.

== Life ==
The exact dates of Acron is not known; but, as he is mentioned as being contemporary with Empedocles, who died about the beginning of the Peloponnesian War, he must have lived in the fifth century BC. From Sicily he went to Athens and there opened a philosophical school (ἐσοφίστευεν).

It is said that Acron was in that city during the great plague (430 BC) and that large fires kindled in the streets at his direction for the purpose of purifying the air proved of great service to several of the sick. There is, however, no mention of this in Thucydides, and if Empedocles or Simonides (d. 467 BC) in fact wrote the epitaph on Acron, he may not have been in Athens during the plague.

On Acron's return to his native country, the physician asked the senate for a spot of ground where he might build a family tomb. The request was refused at the suggestion of Empedocles, who conceived that such a grant for such a purpose would interfere with the principle of equality that he was anxious to establish at Agrigentum. Because the ironic epitaph on the "Acragantine Acron" is among the most replete jeux de mot on record, it so challenges translation that it will be given in Greek to preserve the paronomasia of the original:

ἄκρον ἱητρὸν Ἄκρων' Ἀκραγαντῖνον πατρὸς ἄκρου

κρύπτει κρημνὸς ἄκρος πατρίδος ἀκροτάτης

The second line was sometimes read thus:

ἀκροτάτης κορυφῆς τύμβος ἄκρος κατέχει

More or less: "The lofty physician Loftyman of Loftyville, son of a lofty father, is hidden here under a lofty crag in the loftiest of fatherlands," or "is covered by the lofty tomb of a very lofty peak."

Some attributed the whole epigram to Simonides.

Pliny considers Acron as the first of the Empirics. But this has been considered an error, for the sect alluded to did not arise until the third century BC, roughly 200 years after the time of Acron. Some scholars consider that the sect of the Empirici, in order to boast of a greater antiquity than the Dogmatics (founded about 400 BC by Thessalus the son and Polybus the son-in-law of Hippocrates), merely claimed Acron as their founder.

== Works ==
The Suda mentions two lost works by Acron:

1. On Medicine (Περὶ ἰατρικῆς) written in the Doric dialect
2. On the Food of Healthy People (Περὶ τροφῆς ὑγιεινῶν)

It also says he was among those who noted certain breathings.
