= Philotimus =

Greek physician

Philotimus (Greek: Φιλότιμος) (4th and 3rd centuries BC) was an eminent Greek physician, a pupil of Praxagoras, and a fellow pupil of Herophilus. He was also a contemporary of Erasistratus, and is quoted by Heraclides of Tarentum, and therefore must have lived in the 4th and 3rd centuries BC. Celsus mentions him as one of the eminent physicians of antiquity; and he is quoted by several of the ancient medical writers, viz. Caelius Aurelianus, Oribasius, Aëtius, and very frequently by Galen.

He belonged to the Logical or Dogmatic school, and wrote several medical works, of which only a few fragments remain. Athenaeus quotes a work on Cookery, and another on Food, consisting of at least thirteen books; this later work is several times quoted by Galen. In an anatomical treatise, he pronounced the brain and the heart to be useless organs, and the former to be merely an excessive development and offshoot of the spinal marrow. Philotimus is quoted in various other parts of Galen's writings, and Plutarch relates an anecdote of him. He is also quoted by the scholiast on Homer.
