= Hippocrates (disambiguation) =

Hippocrates was an ancient Greek physician of the Age of Pericles, considered one of the most outstanding figures in the history of medicine.

Hippocrates may also refer to:

- Hippocrates (physician), the name of several other physicians related to Hippocrates
- Hippocrates of Chios (c. 470 – c. 410 BC), ancient Greek geometer who wrote the first known work systematizing the fundamentals of geometry
- Hippocrates of Athens (died 424 BC), ancient Greek general who was slain at the battle of Delium
- Hippocrates, father of Peisistratos
- Hippocrates (lunar crater)
- Hippocrates of Gela, ancient Greek tyrant who dominated Sicilian politics during his rule between 498 BC and 491 BC
- Pseudo-Hippocrates, an anonymous writer, dubbed with the name because his works had been included in Hippocratic Corpus
- Hippocrates Prize for Poetry and Medicine
- Hippocrates Otthen, French physician
- "Hypocrates", song from 2012 album Electra Heart by Welsh singer Marina and the Diamonds
- Hippocrate, a 2014 French film directed by Thomas Lilti

== See also ==
- Harpocrates, Greek god of silence
- Hippocras, drink of spiced wine
- Hypocrite (disambiguation), similar sounding word
