= Mona N. Fouad =

Egyptian-American physician

- Born: Alexandria, Egypt
- Spouse: Fouad H. Fouad

Academic background
- Education: MD, 1977, Alexandria School of Medicine; MPH, 1986, University of Alabama at Birmingham

Academic work
- Institutions: University of Alabama at Birmingham

Mona N. Fouad is an Egyptian-American physician. Fouad is the inaugural holder of the Edward E. Partridge, M.D., Endowed Chair for Cancer Disparity Research at the University of Alabama at Birmingham. As a result of her "lifetime of exceptional work in health and medicine," Fouad was also elected a member of the National Academy of Medicine in 2017.

== Early life and education ==
Fouad was born and raised in Alexandria, Egypt, where she completed her medical degree at the Alexandria School of Medicine. In 1980, Fouad and her husband Fouad H. Fouad moved from Egypt to Texas so he could earn a doctorate in civil engineering from the Texas Agricultural and Mechanical University. Although they originally intended to return to Egypt, Fouad's advisor suggested they come to the University of Alabama at Birmingham (UAB) for a year to get practical experience. While there, she also completed her Master's degree in public health.

== Career ==
Upon completing her master's degree, Fouad began working for the UAB Division of Preventive Medicine and as an instructor in the Department of Medicine. In 2002, she became the founding director of the Minority Health and Health Disparities Research Center (MHRC). Fouad was promoted to the rank of full professor in 2005, and in 2009 became director of the division of Preventive Medicine. While serving in these roles, Fouad also helped establish the O’Neal Comprehensive Cancer Center's patient navigation program based on the Community Health Advisors in Action Program she headed in 2006.

In 2009, Fouad was named to the NIH Minority Health Advisory Council to make recommendations regarding research, training, health information dissemination, and other programs for the National Institute on Minority Health and Health Disparities. She was also appointed to senior associate dean for Diversity and Inclusion in 2014. Her work was recognized in 2016 with the ACS St George Award and an honor as a "Women Who Shape the State." As a result of her "lifetime of exceptional work in health and medicine," Fouad was also elected a member of the National Academy of Medicine in 2017. The following year, she was named co-chair of the Science Committee for the All of Us Research Program.

During the COVID-19 pandemic, Fouad was appointed the inaugural holder of the Edward E. Partridge, M.D., Endowed Chair for Cancer Disparity Research.

== Personal life ==
Fouad and her husband have two daughters together.
