= Polybus (physician) =

4th-century BC Greek physician

Polybus (Ancient Greek: Πόλυβος; fl. c. 400 BC) was one of the pupils of Hippocrates, and also his son-in-law. He lived on the island of Cos in the 4th century BC. With his brothers-in-law, Thessalus and Draco, he was one of the founders of the Dogmatic school of medicine. He was sent by Hippocrates, with his fellow-pupils, during the time of the plague, to assist different cities with his medical skill. Afterwards, he remained in his native country. According to Galen, he followed implicitly the opinions and practices of Hippocrates, but the strict accuracy of this assertion has been doubted.

He has been supposed, by both ancient and modern scholars, to be the author of several works in the Hippocratic collection. Possible works include De Natura Hominis, De Genitura, De Natura Pueri, De Salubri Victus Ratione, De Affectionibus, and De Internis Affectionibus. Clement of Alexandria attributes to him the treatise De Octimestri Partu, and Pseudo-Plutarch quotes him as the author of De Septimestri Partu. De Natura Hominis (On the Nature of Man) is the earliest known text to advance a four-humor system of blood, phlegm, yellow bile, and black bile. Galen, though, considers De Natura Hominis to be the work of Hippocrates himself.

Polybus is mentioned many times by Galen, chiefly in connection with different works in the Hippocratic collection. He is also mentioned by Celsus, Caelius Aurelianus, and Pliny.
