= Mosteller =

Mosteller is a surname of German origin. Notable people with the surname include:

- Brian Mosteller (born 1975), American diplomat
- Frederick Mosteller (1916–2006), American statistician
- Parris Mosteller (born 2001), American actor
- Sue Mosteller (born 1933), Canadian writer

== Music ==
- Carrollton (band), formerly named Mosteller
