= Hypocrisy (disambiguation) =

Hypocrisy is the act of pretending to have beliefs, opinions, virtues, feelings, qualities, or standards that one does not actually have.

Hypocrisy may also refer to:

- Hypocrisy (band), a melodic death metal band
  - Hypocrisy (album), a 1999 album by melodic death metal band Hypocrisy
- Appeal to hypocrisy, a kind of logical fallacy

== See also ==
- Hypocrite (disambiguation)
- Hippocrates (disambiguation)
