= Alexandria School of Medicine =

Ancient Egyptian educational institution

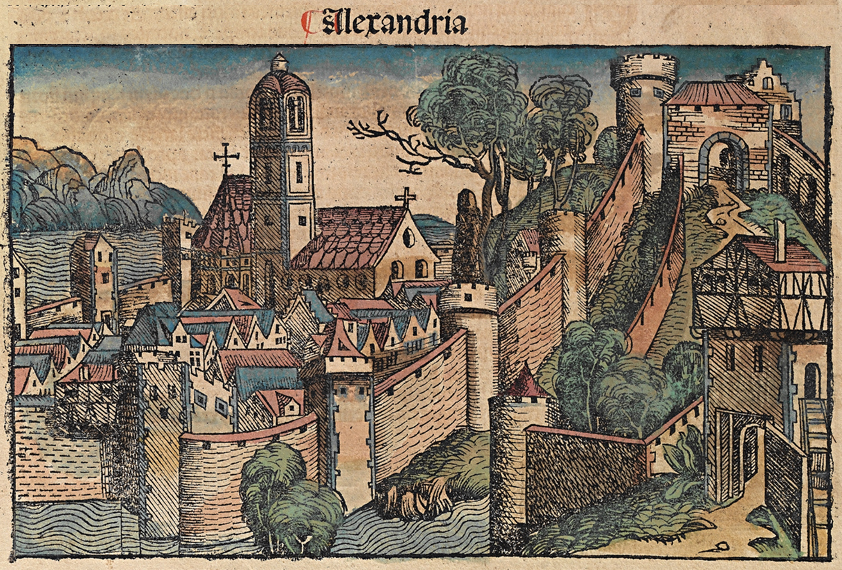
Alexandria, is the city where the empiricist school was founded, which required physicians to succeed, not theoretical knowledge

The Alexandria School of Medicine is one of the oldest empirical educational institutions in the history of medicine initiated during the Hellenistic period in the city of Alexandria (311 BC). At one historical juncture, in Egypt, they united all the different medical doctrines that originated in the East and in Alexandria (increasingly resembling a cosmopolitan city), and merged into one universal "critical mass of knowledge" the Alexandrian empirical school. As the Alexandria School grows more developed Medical Schools in Knossos and in Knidos over time lost their meaning and significance.

== History ==
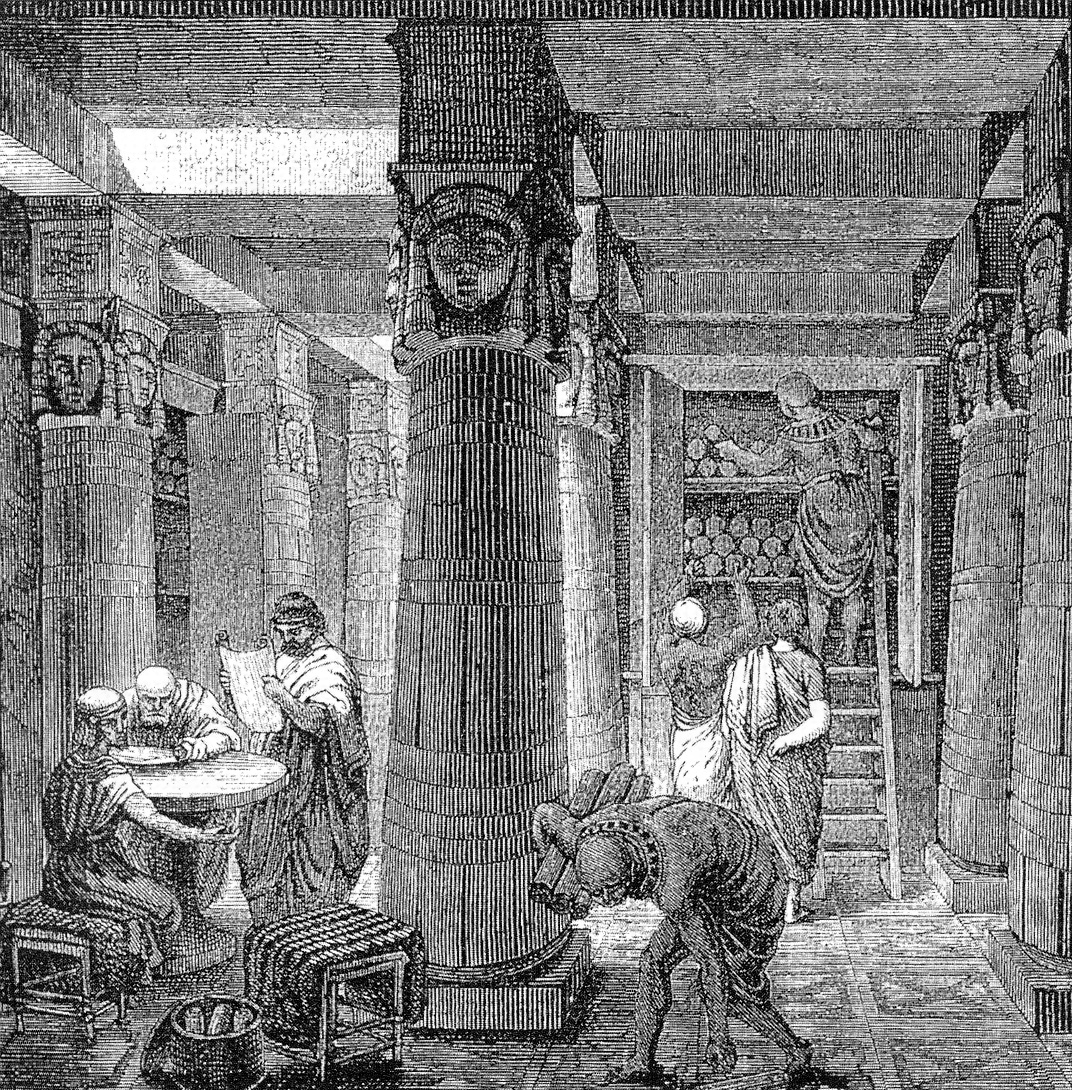
Alexandriks Library was a treasure trove of about 700,000 written rolls (of all the richest human knowledge so far, the richest in the world)

The Greek city of Alexandria, at the mouth of the Nile, was planned and founded by Alexander the Great in 331 BC, and concentrated in it cultural streams from various places: the mysticism of the East and Greek rationalism, in a rich library, with about 700,000 written rolls (the treasure trove of all human knowledge to date; the richest in the world). Thus, with its schools, Alexandria was a kind of university where the most prominent writers, physicians, scientists, and philosophers of the historical period gathered and worked. The ancient Greeks appreciated Egypt and saw in it a mysterious land, fertile with hidden wisdom. At one point, they united all the different medical doctrines originating in the East and in Alexandria (which increasingly resembled a cosmopolitan city) in Egypt, and merged it into one universal critical mass of knowledge. In Alexandria, special importance was given to the study of medicine. The medical works of Hippocrates and Aristotle were studied and the first "Hippocratic Corpus" was collected. Anatomy and methodical study of human corpses are introduced for the first time.

=== Development of anatomy and physiology ===
As the medical science of ancient Greece plunged into political decadence and setbacks - scientific work was renewed in this area, especially in the field of anatomy: numerous sections on corpses and even vivisection on death row inmates were done. From such work the first meaningful written texts about human anatomy were written, as these were the first instances of human dissection in Greek medical practice. Prior to this period, human dissection was taboo.

Anatomists and doctors of the Alexandria School were Herophilos and Erasistratus.

=== Herophilos ===
Although Herophilos (c. 300 BC) is considered to be the founder of true anatomy, it is also a versatile advocate for the use of medicines. He studied all the organs in the body anatomically, and considered the brain a nerve center and soul-carrier.

Herophilos was not only an anatomist but also one of the physicians of that school. He also describes numerous brain structures, which he calls the brain sheaths, choroid plexus and four brain chambers.

=== Erasistratus ===
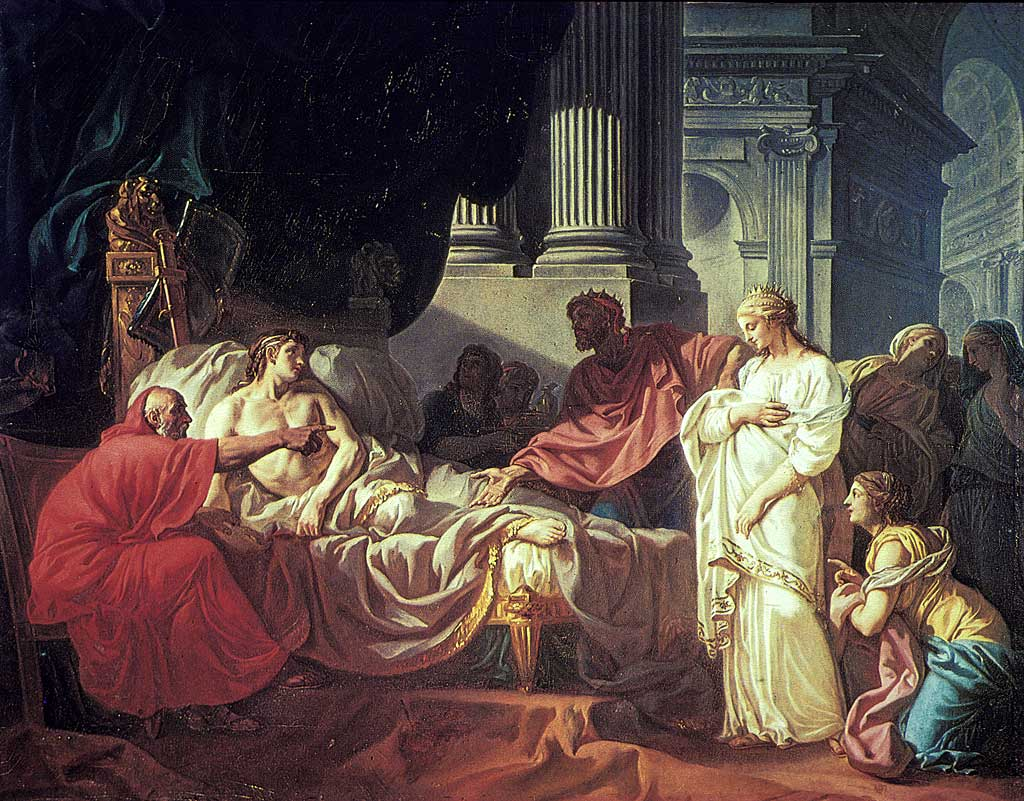
Erasistratus reveals cause of disease in Antiochus.

Erasistratus (304-250 BC), a Greek physician who grew up in Antioch, was an anatomist of that time, who described the numerous anatomical structures of the human body. He was a young contemporary of Herophilos and, with him, the principal representative of the Alexandrian Medical School.

He systematically dissected the corpses, the death row convicts, and probably the bodies of living animals, and thus scientifically advanced the anatomy. He described the heart and its valves, blood vessels and nerves, the brain and its chambers and eddies, brain nerve outputs, lymphatic vessels in the mesentery and liver.

However, Erasistratus's greatest merits are in the field of Physiology. He was the first to correctly describe the physiological functions of ventricular heart valves. Under the influence of the Democritus of atomistics and the peripatetic school, he sought to interpret all life phenomena in a strictly mechanical manner. In his view, three organ systems pass through and are connected by the whole organism: arteries, veins and nerves; the first water pneuma, the second blood, and the third the nerve fluid. The melting of the pneuma down it was reduced to the mechanical work of the heart.

He also tried to explain to the mechanical principles breathing and digestion. The former realized the difference between motor and sensory nerves, and he "threw out" Hippocrates learning, and advocated the use of weak drugs. Erasistratus rejected the humoral and pathology of the "four juices", starting from the view that the diseases were the result of accumulation of blood (plethora) or its deficiency in some part of the body, which resulted in humoral dyscrasia. According to him, the plethora is a vein full of blood, which flows into the arteries and mechanically expels the pneuma there.

As most of the diseases, Erasistratus considered to be due to over-nutrition, he suggested that not much release be used against the plethora blood as a post.

=== Development of surgery and pharmacology ===
The Alexandria School leads to the development of surgery and pharmacology. Medicines are prepared there, but at the same time poisons are investigated and antidotes are prepared.

=== Establishing an empirical school ===
The flourishing of anatomy in the Alexandrian school led to scientific results that were not always in line with the dogmatic school hypotheses. In response to sterile dogmatism, it originated in the 3 BC in Alexandria the so-called. an empirical school that abandoned assumptions, philosophy and theory, adhering only to experience (empirics) as the only means of acquiring new, positive knowledge.

==== Glaucko Tarencio ====
An empiricist school is being developed in Alexandria in parallel. Although the empiricist mode of learning will only gain significance in 17th century when physicians are increasingly seeking success in their work, rather than theoretical knowledge, we find the traces of this teaching in the works of the doctors of the Alexandria School. Its chief representative was the physician Glaucko Tarencio (1 BC), who could be said to have been the forerunner of evidence-based medicine.

For him, only results were the reliable basis; acquired through personal experience, or the experience of other physicians, or similar analogy when he did not have prior data to compare from his or her own or others' experience.

Of the other greats of this school, one should also mention Oribasius a (6th century), who wrote collected works on medicine in 70 books and Paul of Aegina (7th century, the most prominent representative of the Byzantine.

==== Disadvantages of the empirical school ====
The empirical school had its downsides. The abandonment of the theory caused a decline in the scientific level of medicine, which increasingly began to focus solely on practical problems. The link between physiology and pathology disappeared, and in the end, only the external signs of the disease, the symptoms, were important to the physician at that time.

=== Alexandrian Medical School Principal of Medical Astrology ===
The beginnings of medical astrology are found in the works of physicians and philosophers from the Greco-Alexandrian period. Philosophers, but above all physicians at the Alexandria Medical School, resorted to astrology and valued it as a skill that significantly helps man.

With all the differences between astrology and medicine, which are actually skills - artes (and medicine is actually until the 19th century, although such determination is still heated today, (Note: According to the ancient conception in these disciplines it is not a matter of scientific knowledge, since they deal only with the individual; science is only possible if it is general, safe, necessary, while individually only uncertain knowledge can be acquired.) there are significant connections. Both disciplines are based on observation and experience and involve both theoretical and practical aspects. If we take into account the fact that astrology is first and foremost a branch of divination, then it is clear that at least one part of medicine, i.e. prognostics, can be related to astrology. However, if we look back at the history of medicine and start from Greek medicine, we will see that according to many sources, astrology throughout the history of medicine is already a significant part of it Hippocrates (which respected many astrological rules).

The role of astrology in medicine is indicated by a large group of texts in the so-called. popular Hermeticism, a scripture attributed to the legendary Egyptians Neheps and Petoziris and Hermes Trismegistos (who was considered the patron saint of astrology and alchemy), dated as early as 3 BC, in which the connection between astrology and medicine was discovered. In their works they are mainly texts that study the field of botany, mineralogy, but also medicine and medical astrology. In these, certain medicinal plants and minerals, as well as parts of the human body, are associated with zodiac signs, with planets and their positions, etc. In all these astrological-alchemical-magical tracts, the basic assumption is the thesis about the interconnectedness of all parts of the cosmos, the thesis about the operation of the laws of sympathy and antipathy.

Astrology plays an important role in medicine, not only in predicting the course of the disease, but also in their treatment. The connection between astrology and medicine is also emphasized in the works of Claudius Ptolemy (2nd century), especially in those in which astrology, such as the "Quadripartitum and Centiloquium", were works widely used by physicians, which also existed under the name Kαρπος, and which were attributed to and reproduced throughout the Middle Ages and the Renaissance (later, however, this attribution proved to be incorrect).
