= Life, Larry and the Pursuit of Unhappiness =

2026 American TV series

- Genre: Sketch comedy; Historical comedy
- Created by: Larry David; Jeff Schaffer
- Starring: Larry David
- Narrated by: Samuel L. Jackson
- Country of origin: United States
- Original language: English
- No. of episodes: 7

Production
- Executive producers: Larry David; Jeff Schaffer; Barack Obama; Michelle Obama; Ethan Lewis; Vinnie Malhotra
- Production company: Higher Ground Productions

Original release
- Network: HBO
- Release: June 26 – August 7, 2026

Life, Larry and the Pursuit of Unhappiness (also known as Life, Larry and the Pursuit of Unhappiness: An Almost History of America) is a 2026 American sketch comedy miniseries created by Larry David and Jeff Schaffer. Produced by Barack and Michelle Obama's Higher Ground Productions, the series premiered on HBO on June 26, 2026, and concluded on August 7, 2026. The series takes an improvised, comedic approach to major events in American history in celebration of the 250th anniversary of the founding of the United States. The show consists of seven episodes, each containing approximately four historical sketches. Much like David and Schaffer's previous HBO series, Curb Your Enthusiasm (2000–2024), the dialogue is largely unscripted and heavily improvised based on structural outlines.

== Premise ==
Created as a comedic tribute to the United States Semiquincentennial, the series explores major events in American history through the lens of Larry David's signature observational humor.

== Cast ==
=== Main ===
- Larry David as Robert R. Livingston, Alexander Graham Bell, Meriwether Lewis, Samuel J. Tilden, Joseph McCarthy, Deep Throat, James Buchanan, Buzz Aldrin, George Donner and various other characters

=== Recurring ===
- Samuel L. Jackson as Narrator (voiceover)

=== Guest ===
- Barack Obama as himself
- Adam Lustick as Jonas Salk
- Alan Blumenfeld as Stuart Symington
- Alan Tudyk as Thomas Jefferson
- Andrea Savage as Cordelia
- Beck Bennett as Bob Woodward
- Bill Hader as Abraham Lincoln
- Brad Morris as Joseph Warren
- Chris Parnell as Benjamin Franklin
- Colton Dunn as Dominic - Soup Server
- Diallo Riddle as John Appleton
- Don Johnson as Doc Holliday
- Essence Atkins as Clara
- Fred Melamed as William Henry Harrison
- Greg Kinnear as Donner Party rescuer
- Henry Winkler as John Hancock
- Ike Barinholtz as Henry Ford
- Isla Fisher as Elsbeth
- J. B. Smoove as Jonesey
- Jane Krakowski as Edith
- Jeff Garlin as Benjamin Donner
- Jerry Seinfeld as William Clark
- Jimmy Kimmel as Crowd Member 1
- Joe Manganiello as Johnny, a V-J day marine
- Joe Regalbuto as Dr. Carlton
- Jon Hamm as Orville Wright
- Jordan Black as Samuel Cooper
- Jordana Brewster as Beatrice
- Judy Gold as Evelyn
- June Diane Raphael as Eliza Donner
- Jurnee Smollett as Rosa Parks
- Kaley Cuoco as Gloria - Widow
- Kathryn Hahn as Mary Todd Lincoln
- Katie Aselton as Sylvia
- Keegan-Michael Key as Davy Crockett
- Kyle Mooney as Paul Revere
- Larry Wilmore as Barney
- Lennon Parham as Laura Keene
- Lin-Manuel Miranda as Michael Finney
- Lisa Arch as Anna Harrison
- Marc Menchaca as Joseph Clanton
- Merle Dandridge as Clementine
- Michael Chiklis as Sarge
- Michael McKean as Joseph Welch
- Mo Gaffney as Mabel
- Neil Casey as Dr. Harrington
- Oscar Nunez as Antonio López de Santa Anna
- Paul Rudd as Neil Armstrong
- Rich Fulcher as Tilden's Aide
- Richard Kind as Thomas A. Watson
- Rita Wilson as Mavis Lewis, wife of Meriwether Lewis
- Rob Huebel as Karl Mundt
- Rob Reiner as George Washington
- Rory Scovel as Jefferson Davis
- Sean Hayes as Wilbur Wright
- Seth Morris as Andrew Johnson
- Susie Essman as Susan B. Anthony
- Timothy Olyphant as Wyatt Earp
- Toby Huss as Herbert
- Tru Valentino as Ottoman
- Vince Vaughn as Jacob Donner
- Wayne Federman as Alfred
- Andrew Clubok as Charles E. Potter

== Episodes ==
No.	Title	Directed by	Written by	Original release date
1	"Livingston"	Jeff Schaffer	Larry David & Jeff Schaffer	June 26, 2026
Barack Obama gives a cold open introduction; Robert R. Livingston offers his first draft of the Declaration of Independence, which he has filled with his own pet peeves and grievances; Alexander Graham Bell gives a public demonstration of his invention; a World War I soldier is hesitant about sending a comrade's letter home; a white seatmate stands up for Rosa Parks, but makes her bus ride uncomfortable with his inane conversation.
2	"Farewell"	Jeff Schaffer	Larry David & Jeff Schaffer	July 3, 2026
Meriwether Lewis must overcome the objections of his wife to go on an expedition; Samuel J. Tilden is furious to hear that he has lost the 1876 presidential election despite winning a majority of the popular vote; a man complains about conditions at a soup kitchen during the Great Depression and attempts to seduce a newly widowed woman; George Washington's announcement that he will not seek a third term descends into chaos after he is presented with the hypothetical scenario of a king overstaying his rule.
3	"McCarthy"	Jeff Schaffer	Larry David & Jeff Schaffer	July 10, 2026
A man is offended that he was not invited to the Boston Tea Party; a host on the Underground Railroad endures the complaints of his guest; the Wright brothers' first powered flight is interrupted by their other brother; Joseph McCarthy lambasts attendees at the Army–McCarthy hearings for various discourtesies.
4	"Deepthroat"	Jeff Schaffer	Larry David & Jeff Schaffer	July 17, 2026
Deep Throat gives Bob Woodward trivial gossip instead of information about the Watergate scandal; Henry Ford reluctantly gives a test drive to a rabbi, crashes the car and receives a blood donation from him; President James Buchanan attempts to seduce various women at a ball and argues with Jefferson Davis about the merits of hors d'oeuvre versus sit-down dinners; Jonas Salk's mother boasts about his achievements to her neighbour.
5	"Lincoln"	Jeff Schaffer	Larry David & Jeff Schaffer	July 24, 2026
An annoying man accidentally causes and then flees from the Gunfight at the O.K. Corral; a friend of Abraham Lincoln persuades him to take in a show; Lincoln's friend meets with new president Andrew Johnson and is tasked with evicting Mary Todd Lincoln from the White House.
6	"Buzz"	Jeff Schaffer	Larry David & Jeff Schaffer	July 31, 2026
Paul Revere's midnight ride leads to an argument between a married couple; Mexican forces prepare to attack the Alamo after learning that Davy Crockett is bald; Susan B. Anthony hosts a dinner party where a guest suggests that ugly women should be allowed to vote but that beautiful women should not; Neil Armstrong and Buzz Aldrin bicker during their descent to the moon.
7	"Lawrence"	Jeff Schaffer	Larry David & Jeff Schaffer	August 7, 2026
On V-J Day in Times Square, a man is inspired by a famous kiss; William Henry Harrison falls ill after his inauguration and is persuaded by a friend to "feed the fever"; the Donner Party is met by rescuers, who find that they have resorted to cannibalism; President Obama's suit is ruined by a clumsy aide, who persuades him to wear a tan suit to a press conference; Obama closes the episode.

== Production ==
In July 2025, HBO announced that it had ordered an untitled half-hour sketch comedy series developed by Larry David and Jeff Schaffer. The project was revealed to be a collaboration with Higher Ground Productions, the production company founded by former US President Barack Obama and First Lady Michelle Obama. Both Obamas, Ethan Lewis, and Vinnie Malhotra serve as executive producers alongside David and Schaffer.

The series title and the first teaser trailer were released in May 2026, with the first full trailer released the following month.

== Release ==
Life, Larry and the Pursuit of Unhappiness premiered on HBO on June 26, 2026. The seven-episode limited series aired weekly through its finale on August 7, 2026.

== Reception ==
On the review aggregator website Rotten Tomatoes, the show holds an approval rating of 58% with an average rating of 5.9/10, based on 38 reviews. The website's critics consensus is, "Life, Larry and the Pursuit of Unhappiness offers flashes of Larry David's trademark caustic wit but its repetitive sketches and inconsistent satire make for a surprisingly lightweight, intermittently funny take on American history." Metacritic assigned it a weighted average score of 58 out of 100, based on 25 reviews, signifying "mixed or average" reviews.
