= Hypocrite (disambiguation) =

A hypocrite is person who indulges in hypocrisy.

Hypocrite(s) or The Hypocrite may also refer to:

== Books ==
- The Hypocrite, a 1768 play by Isaac Bickerstaff
- Ayit Tzavua or The Hypocrite, an 1858 Hebrew novel by Abraham Mapu
- The Hypocrite, a, 1898 novel by C. Ranger-Gull
- The Hypocrites, a 1906 play by Henry Arthur Jones
- the hypocrites, a translation of the Arabic title al-Munāfiqūn, Quranic Chapter 63

== Film and TV ==
- Hypocrites (1915 film), directed by Lois Weber
- The Hypocrites (1916 film)
- The Hypocrite (1922 film), directed by Oscar Micheaux
- The Hypocrites (1923 film), a 1923 British Dutch silent film directed by Charles Giblyn based on the 1906 play
- Hypocrite (film) (Spanish: Hipócrita), a 1949 Mexican film
- The Hypocrites (1965 film) (Los hipócritas), a 1965 Argentine crime film
- Die Scheinheiligen or The Hypocrites, a 2001 German film

== Music ==
- The Hypocrite, a 1995 album by Ryan Downe
- "Hypocrite", a 1994 single by Lush from Split
- "Hypocrite", a song by Falz from Moral Instruction
- "Hypocrites", a song by KoRn
- "Hypocrite", a song by Cage the Elephant from Melophobia

== Other uses ==
- Hypocrite Channel, a channel in Massachusetts Bay
- The Hypocrites (theatre company), a Chicago-based theatre company

== See also ==
- Hypocrisy (disambiguation)
- Hippocrates (disambiguation)
