= Hippocrates (physicians) =

Group of same-named physicians

Hippocrates (Greek: Ἱπποκράτης) was the name of several physicians in the time of Ancient Greece, some of whom were in the same family as the celebrated Hippocrates of Kos (Hippocrates II).

- Hippocrates I. The grandfather of Hippocrates II. He was the eldest son of Gnosidicus, the brother of Podaleirius and Aeneius, and the father of Heraclides, the father of Hippocrates. He lived in the 6th and 5th centuries BC. Some ancient writers attributed to him the two works De Fracturis and De Articulis, while others contended that he wrote nothing at all.
- Hippocrates II of Kos, usually known simply as Hippocrates. Grandson of Hippocrates I, and the most celebrated physician of ancient Greece for his significant contribution to the field medicine.
- Hippocrates III. The son of Thessalus, the brother of Draco II, and the grandson of Hippocrates II. He lived in the 4th century BC. He is said by the Suda to have written some medical works.
- Hippocrates IV. According to Galen (Latin: Galenus), he was the son of Draco I, and the grandson of Hippocrates II; he lived in the 4th century BC, and is said to have written some medical works. The Suda, which may be confused, makes him the son of Draco II, (and therefore, the great-grandson of Hippocrates II), and the father of Draco III. He is said to have been one of the physicians to Roxana, the wife of Alexander the Great, and to have died at the hands of Cassander, the son of Antipater.
- Hippocrates V and VI. According to the Suda, Thymbraeus of Kos had two sons named Hippocrates, each of whom wrote some medical works. Their date is unknown.
- Hippocrates VII. The son of Praxianax of Kos. He wrote some medical works.

== See also ==
- Hippocrates Otthen, French physician
