= Plistonicus =

Plistonicus (or Pleistonicus, Greek: Πλειστόνικος), was an ancient Greek physician, a pupil of Praxagoras, who therefore lived in the 4th and 3rd centuries BC. He appears to have written a work on anatomy, which is several times mentioned by Galen, who calls him one of the most eminent physicians of his time. He is quoted by Pliny, Athenaeus, Oribasius, and Gariopontus. None of his writings have survived.
