= Praxagoras =

Ancient Greek physician

Praxagoras (Ancient Greek: Πραξαγόρας ὁ Κῷος) was a figure of medicine in ancient Greece. He was born on the Greek island of Kos in about 340 BC. Both his father, Nicarchus, and his grandfather were physicians. Very little is known of Praxagoras' personal life, and none of his writings have survived.

== History ==
Between the death of Hippocrates in 375 BC and the founding of the school in Alexandria, Egypt, Greek medicine became entrenched with speculation, seeing little advances in medicine. During this period four men took up the study of anatomy: Diocles of Carystus (fl. 4th century BC), Herophilos (c. 335–280 BC), Erasistratus (c. 304–250 BC), and finally Praxagoras.

Galen (AD 129–216), a famous Greek physician, wrote of Praxagoras as this influential figure in Greek medicine and a member of the logical or Dogmatic school. Galen also probably knew of the works of Praxagoras, writing on natural sciences, anatomy, causes and treatment of disease, and on acute diseases.

Praxagoras adopted a variation of the humoral theory, but instead of the four humors (blood, phlegm, yellow bile, and black bile) that most physicians held, he insisted on eleven. Like the other Greek physicians, he believed health and disease were controlled by the balance or imbalance of these humors. For example, if the proper amount of heat is present in the organism, the process of digestion is natural. Too little or too much heat will cause a rise in the other humors, which then produces certain disease conditions. He considered digestion to be a kind of putrefaction or decomposition, an idea that was held until the 19th century.

Praxagoras was also influential in the Alexandrian school in particular. After the death of Alexander the Great (356–323 BC), Egypt fell to the hands of General Ptolemy, who established a modern university with the first great medical school of antiquity. Human dissection was practiced, mostly by Herophilos and Erasistratus; Praxagoras was Herophilos' teacher. Although the university in Alexandria and its massive library was destroyed by bands of conquerors, later Arabic physicians made the efforts to preserve some of the writings. After the fall of the Byzantine Empire, Greek scholars brought back Greek medicine to the medical schools of the Western Renaissance.

== Praxagoras' theory of circulation ==
Praxagoras studied Aristotle's (384–322 BC) anatomy and improved it by distinguishing between artery and veins. He saw arteries as air tubes, similar to the trachea and bronchi, which carried pneuma, the mystic force of life. Arteries took the breath of life from the lungs to the left side of the heart through the aorta to the arteries of the body. He believed the arteries stemmed from the heart, but the veins came from the liver. Veins carried blood, which was created by digested food, to the rest of the body. The combination of blood and pneuma generated heat. As one of the humors, thick, cold phlegm gathered in the arteries would cause paralysis. Also, he believed that arteries were the channels through which voluntary motion was given to the body, and that the cause of epilepsy was the blocking of the aorta by this same accumulation of phlegm.

Aristotle, Diocles, and Praxogoras insisted that the heart was the central organ of intelligence and the seat of thought. Praxagoras differed with the others in that he believed the purpose of respiration was to provide nourishment for the psychic pneuma, rather than to cool the inner heat.

=== Arteries and pulse ===
Praxagoras' views on arteries were very influential in the development of physiology. Since the concept of nerves did not exist, Praxagoras explained the movement of arteries to the fact that arteries get smaller and smaller, and then disappear. This disappearance caused movement, a fact now attributed to nerves. However, he speculated about the role of movement and was satisfied that he had found the answer of the center of vitality and energy. His pupil, Herophilos, actually discovered both sensory and motor nerves.

Praxagoras was interested in pulse and was the first to direct attention to the importance of arterial pulse in diagnosis. He insisted that arteries pulsed by themselves and were independent of the heart. Herophilus refuted this doctrine in his treatise "On Pulses." In another area, Galen criticized Praxagoras for displaying too little care in anatomy. He suggested that Praxagoras did not arrive at his theories by dissection.

The beliefs of Praxagoras held sway for centuries. For example, for nearly 500 years after his death, many still believed that arteries did not contain blood but pneuma. His most famous pupil, Herophilos, was instrumental in establishing the marvelous medical establishment at Alexandria.

== See also ==
- Galen
- Hippocrates
- William Harvey
- Marcello Malpighi
