= Hippocratic Museum =

Museum in Kos, Greece

The Hippocratic Museum is a museum, on the Greek island of Kos. Its exhibits display the history of the Hippocratic Foundation of Kos, which is dedicated to transmitting knowledge about Hippocrates, as well as founding hospitals and institutes. The ancient Greek physician Hippocrates is believed to have been born there. The displays include some literature about the Hippocratic medicine.
