= Brian Mosteller =

American diplomat and executive (born 1975)

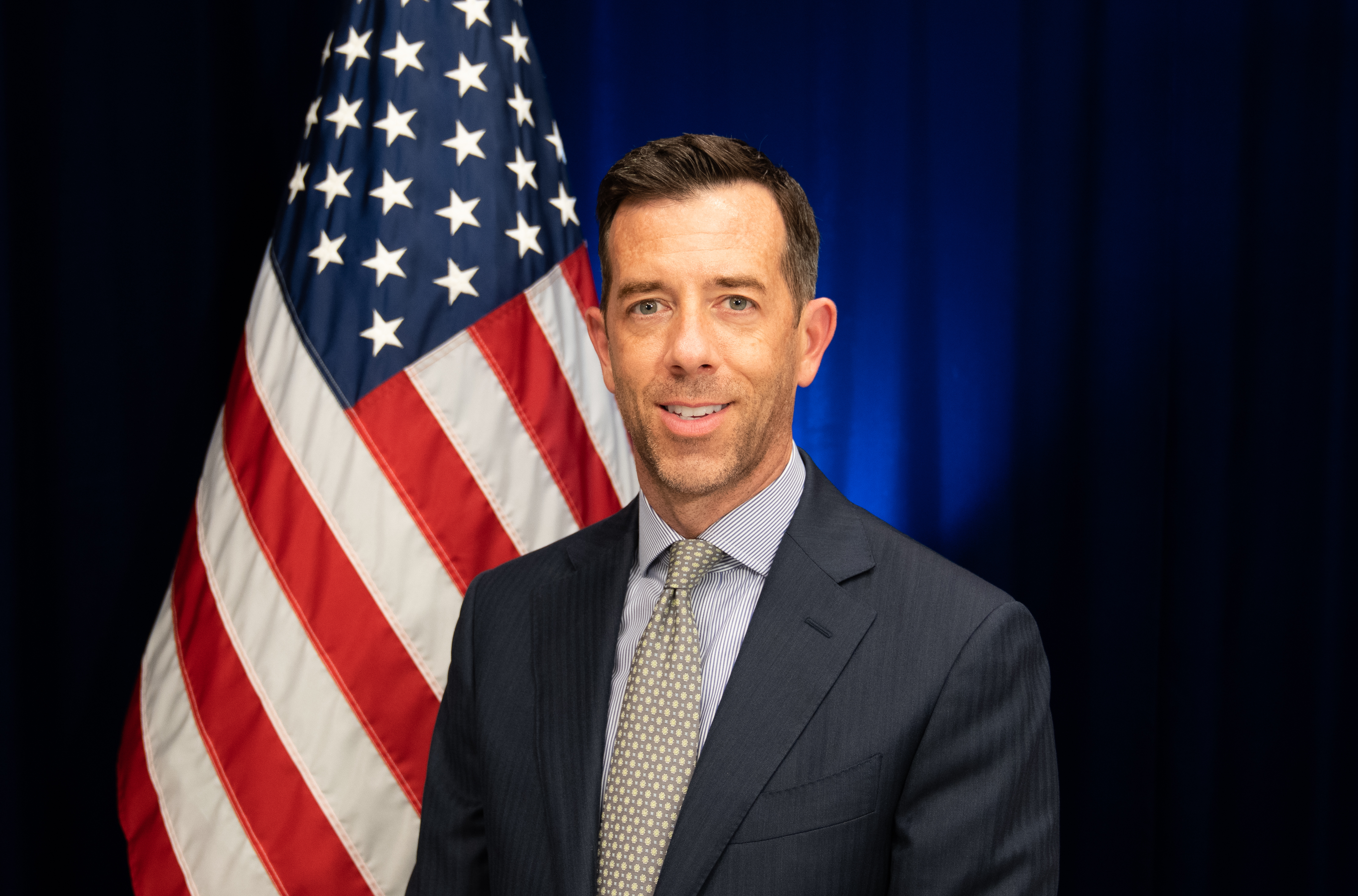

Director of Oval Office Operations
- In office January 20, 2009 – January 20, 2017
- President: Barack Obama

Personal details
- Born: December 6, 1975 (age 50) Akron, Ohio, U.S.
- Party: Democratic
- Spouse: Joe Mahshie (m. 2016)
- Education: DePaul University; Ohio State University (BS)

Brian Mosteller (born December 6, 1975) is an American diplomat and operations executive, best known for being the Director of Oval Office Operations in the Obama administration, from 2009 to 2017.

== Early career ==
Mosteller was born in Akron, Ohio, and graduated from Revere High School. He attended DePaul University in Chicago, Illinois, and the Ohio State University in Columbus, Ohio, where he graduated summa cum laude with a degree in international business. He joined the Clinton administration in 1998. There, he traveled consistently for two and a half years advancing President Clinton and then-First Lady Hillary Clinton around the world and domestically. In 2001, he was part of preparations for the 2002 Winter Olympics in Salt Lake City, organizing the bobsled, luge and ski jumping competitions in Park City. His Olympic experiences continued as Operations and Logistics Manager for a private entity at the 2004 Summer Olympics and 2006 Winter Olympics.

== Obama era ==
Residing in Chicago, Mosteller assisted with the Obama presidential campaign at its inception in February 2007. Working in Iowa, New Hampshire, and other pivotal states, he developed many of the policies and procedures used by the teams organizing the candidate's travels and events. He was involved in the on-site organization of the 2008 primary debates and executed the senator's role at the Democratic National Convention in Denver. Following Obama's election, Mosteller moved to Washington, D.C., and started in the Oval Office hours after the inaugural. Mosteller was one of the longest serving staff members in the administration.

Anonymous colleagues noted that "if you [want a meeting] at two in the morning, you go through him" and GQ Magazine ranked Mosteller on their "DC Power List" in 2010. In West Winging It, a retrospect of the administration published in 2018, the author references him as "responsible for maintaining dignity throughout the West Wing." In a 2017 interview, Obama said of Mosteller, "He's a tireless manager and leader with a knack for sweating the small stuff" and in the former president's 2020 memoir, A Promised Land, Obama refers to him as "fastidious".

== Post-administration ==
In 2020, Mosteller was referenced as a "top aide" to tech mogul Mark Zuckerberg and headed his personal office for almost five years. He had departed Silicon Valley, California, for the East Coast and consulted on private projects before being hired by the Biden administration.

In 2026 he played himself (as "Director of Oval Office Operations") in Episode 7 ("Lawrence") of Life, Larry and the Pursuit of Unhappiness.

== State Department ==
Mosteller formerly worked as Chief of Staff to Ambassador Rahm Emanuel.

== Personal life ==
Mosteller is openly gay. On August 1, 2016, at his official residence, then-Vice President Joe Biden officiated at the wedding of Mosteller and Joe Mahshie, a member of First Lady Michelle Obama's White House staff.

== Gallery ==
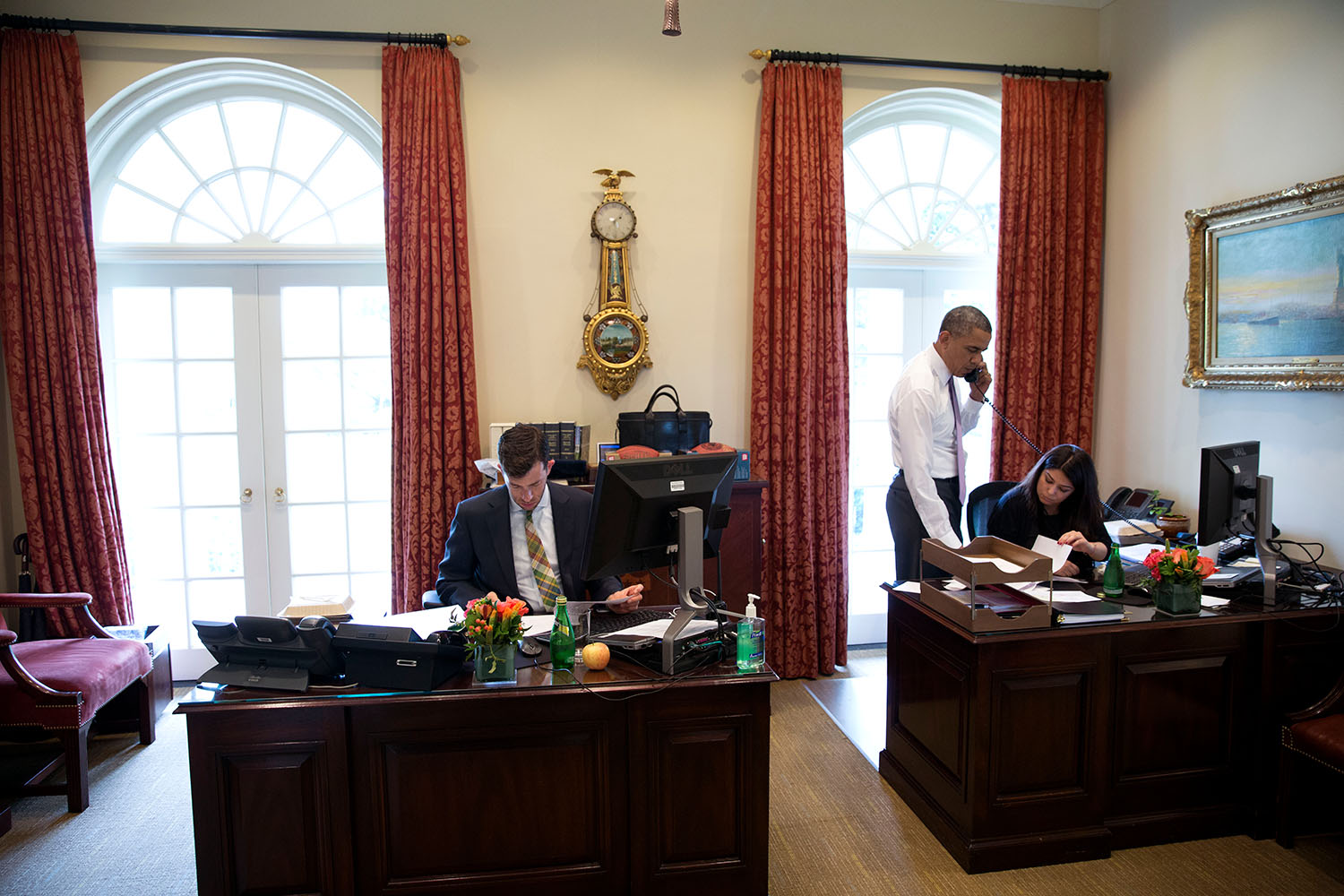
Mosteller works in the Outer Oval Office as President Obama completes a phone call adjacent.

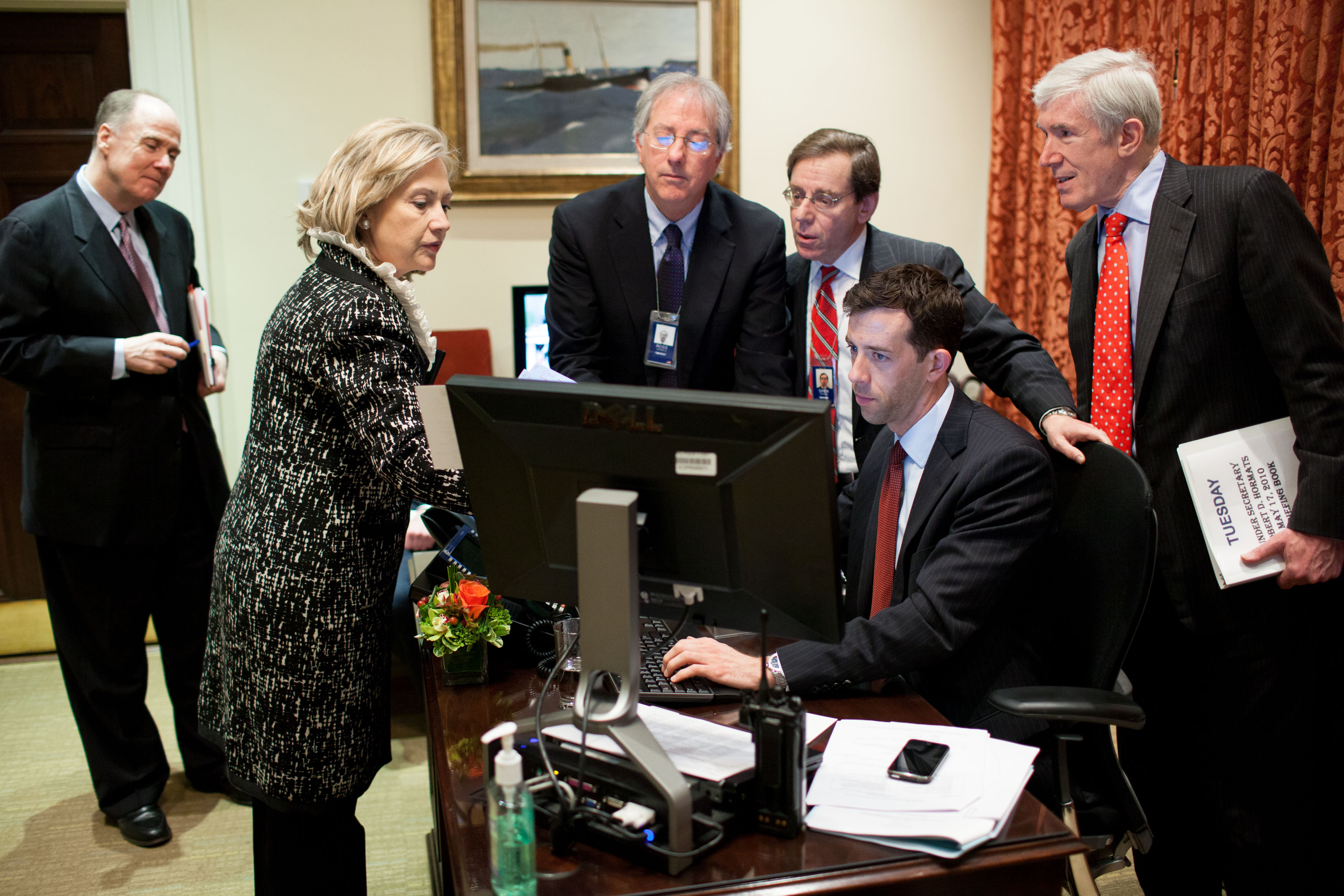
Mosteller works on a speech with Secretary Clinton and other administration staff.

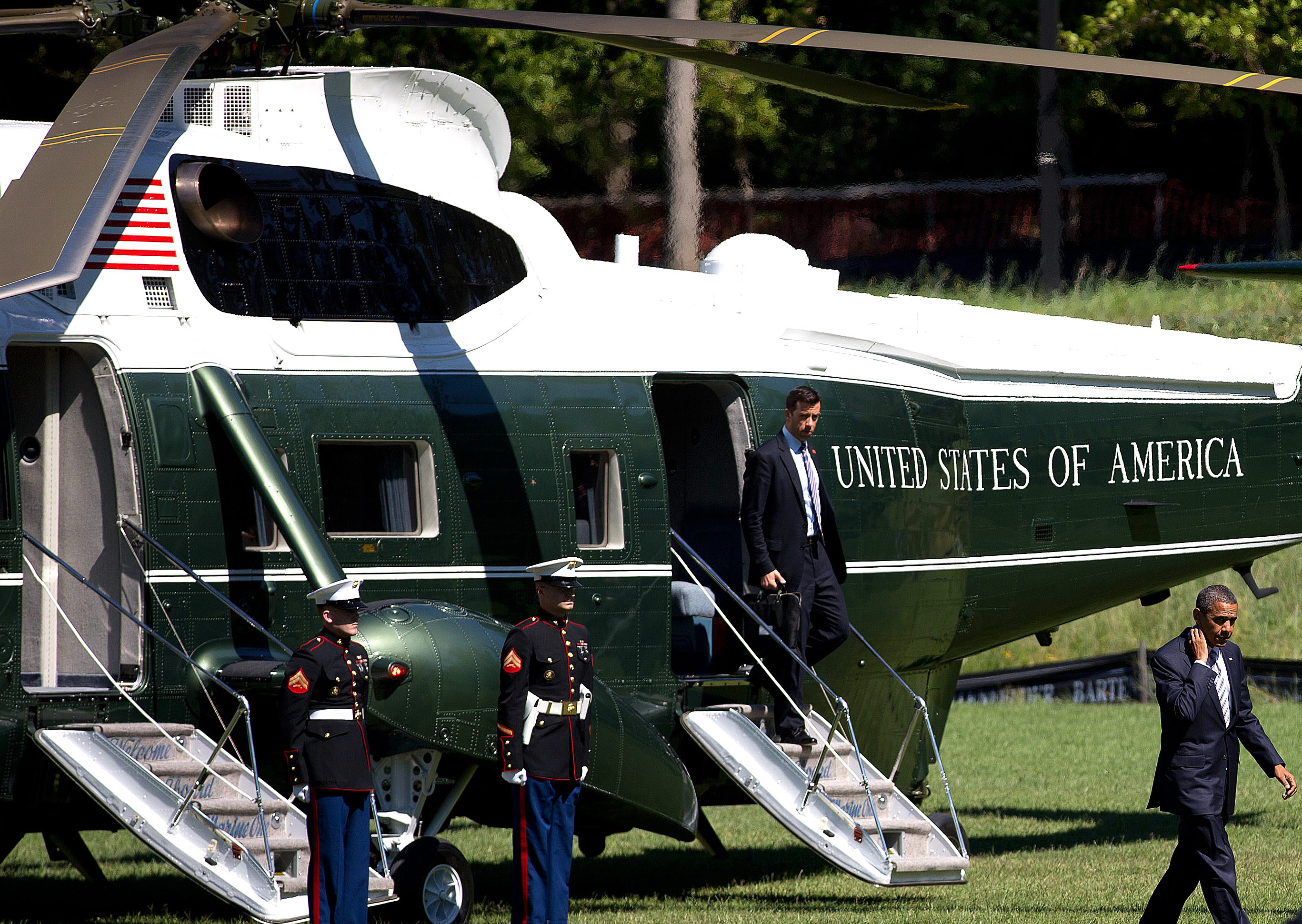
Mosteller departs Marine One behind President Obama.

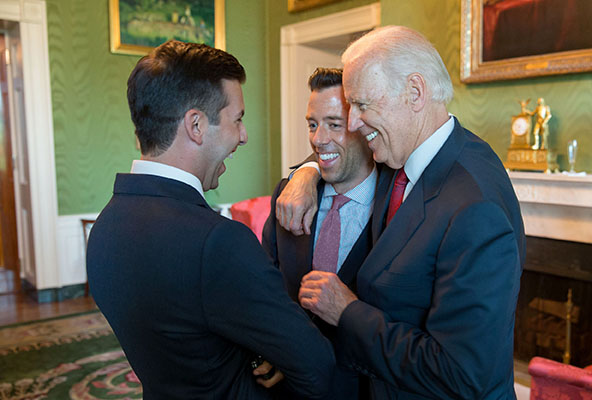
Mosteller with husband Joe Mahshie and Vice President Biden.

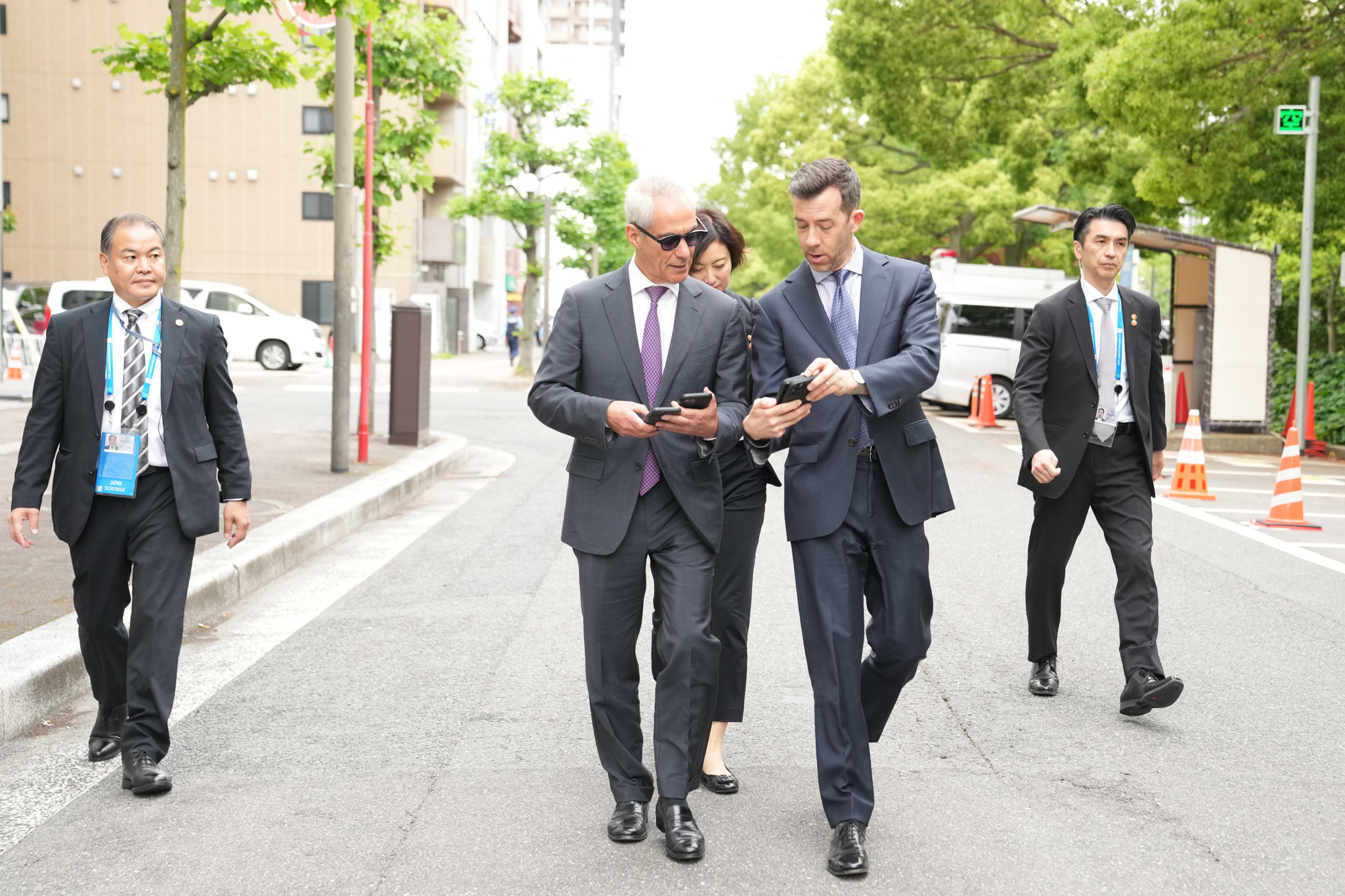
Mosteller with Ambassador Emanuel in Hiroshima, Japan
