= The Hippocrates Project =

Program of the New York University Medical Center

The Hippocrates Project is a program of the New York University Medical Center which works with modern technologies to "enhance the learning process". It was established in 1987, presumably named after the ancient Greek physician Hippocrates.

== History ==
The Hippocrates Project began in 1987 in an unused microbiology laboratory by six medical students (Alan Simon, M.D.; Howard M. Karpoff, MD and others) and one member of the faculty, Martin Nachbar, MD (1937-2015). It was one of the early adopters of the use of computers and multimedia in education. Courseware was created, such as a computerized atlas of Histology in HyperCard and a multidimensional Neuroanatomy Atlas using SuperCard. Software expanded to include other courseware, digitized video, and 3-D simulations of surgery, such as Laparoscopic Cholecystectomy. One digitized video program taught medical students the “Signs and Symptoms of Mental Illness” through videos of actual patients demonstrating them. The Hippocrates Project also created early versions of the electronic medical record. As of 1997, the Hippocrates Project is officially an Educational Computing Division (ECD).

== Accomplishments ==
Hippocrates has produced over 100 "medical education modules", most of which are used in NYU curricula as exercises or as educational resources. These "modules" may be "expository presentations, laboratory simulations, self-assessment and testing programs, three-dimensional anatomic reconstructions, animations, virtual reality environments, case studies, and databases". The Hippocrates Project also provides email services, hosts websites, grades examinations by computer, and automates course surveys.
