= Hippocratic bench =

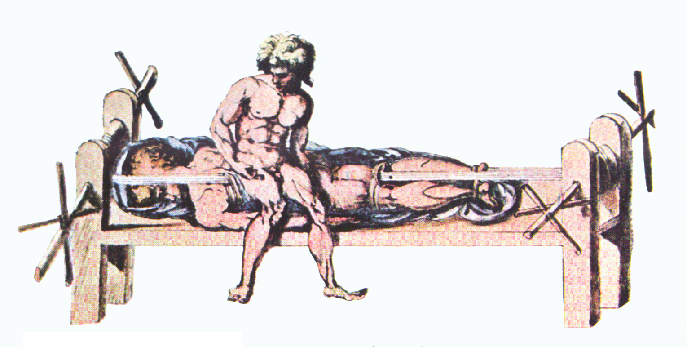
From a Byzantine edition of Galen's work in the 2nd century AD.

The Hippocratic bench or scamnum was a device invented by Hippocrates (c. 460 BC–380 BC), which used tension to aid in setting bones. It is a rudimentary form of the traction devices used in modern orthopedics, primarily designed for the reduction of dislocations and the setting of fractures, particularly those of the spine and long bones. It represented an early understanding of applying controlled force and counter-force to achieve anatomical realignment in a medical context. Despite its historical significance as an innovative tool for its time, the Hippocratic bench was a simple and often forceful device, lacking the precision and safety mechanisms of modern orthopedic equipment.

== History ==
The Hippocratic bench is named after Greek physician Hippocrates (c. 460–c. 370 BCE), often referred to as the "Father of Medicine." While it is attributed to him, the exact period of its invention and whether Hippocrates himself designed it or merely described its use is not definitively established. However, detailed descriptions of traction techniques and devices resembling the Hippocratic bench are found in the Hippocratic Corpus, a collection of ancient Greek medical works. These texts, particularly detail methods for manipulating bones and joints that closely align with the function of such a bench.

== Design and mechanism ==
The design of the Hippocratic bench was essentially a lever-based traction system, a simple yet effective machine for applying sustained force. The Hippocratic bench functioned as a traction apparatus, typically consisting of a strong, elongated wooden framework. Patients would be secured to the bench, and traction was applied using ropes, pulleys, and sometimes a windlass (a crank-operated device for pulling ropes). The objective was to generate sustained tension on the affected body part, such as a limb or the spine, to overcome muscle spasms and facilitate the realignment of dislocated joints or fractured bones.

== Applications ==
The Hippocratic bench was primarily utilized for the reduction of dislocations and the management of fractures, particularly those involving long bones and the spine. For spinal conditions, the bench was used to apply axial traction to correct deformities like scoliosis or to relieve pressure on the spinal cord. In cases of fractured femurs or tibias, the device was instrumental in applying sustained pull to align the broken bone segments, a crucial step before immobilization. For dislocated joints, such as the shoulder or hip, the powerful traction helped to overcome the resistance of surrounding muscles and soft tissues, allowing the joint to be maneuvered back into its correct anatomical position. The Hippocratic bench, while no longer in direct use, is a precursor for the traction devices used in modern orthopedic medicine.
