= Dogmatic school =

School of medicine in ancient Greece and Rome

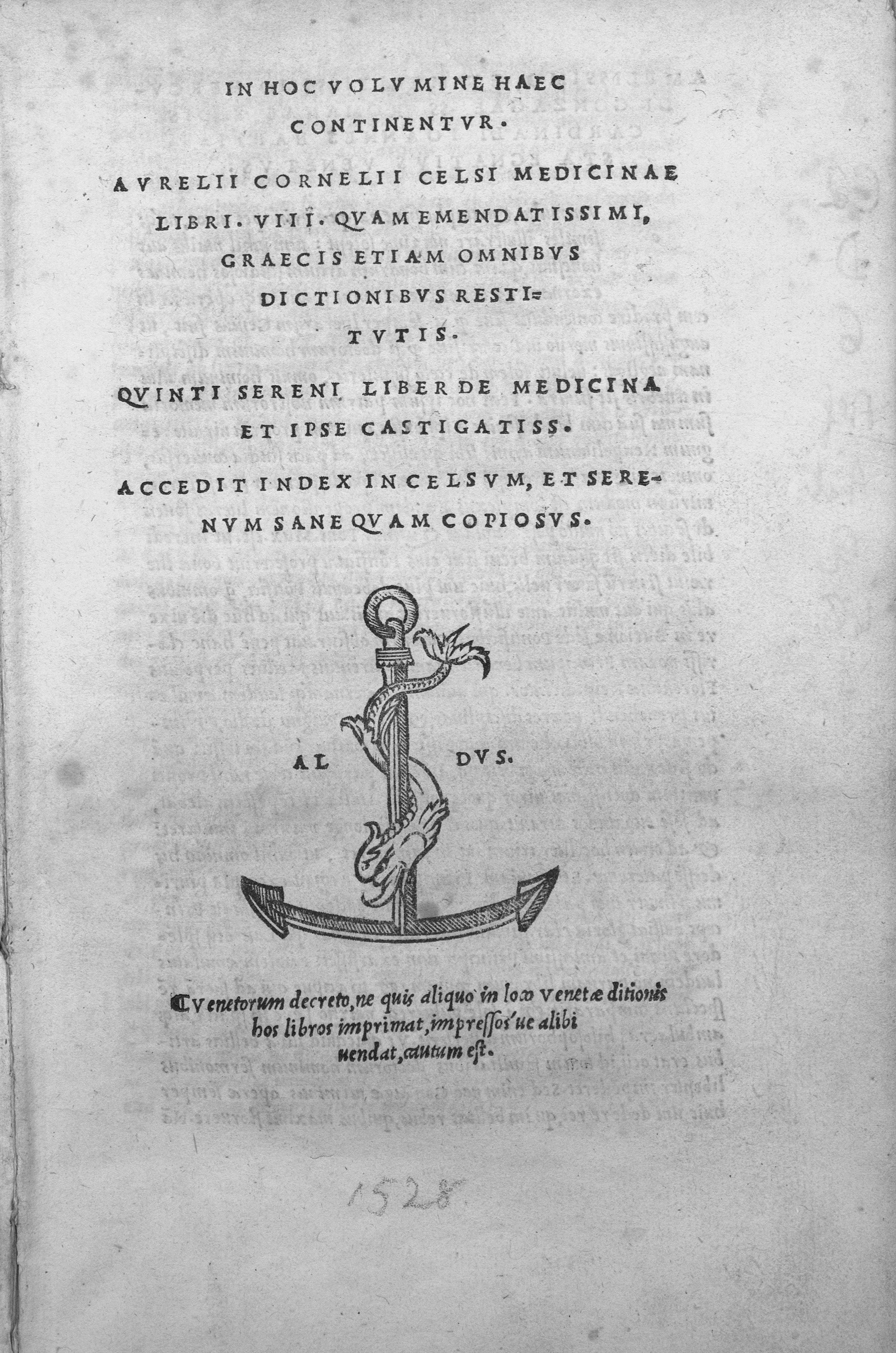
De medicina

The Dogmatic school of medicine (Dogmatics, or Dogmatici, Greek: Δογματικοί) was a school of medicine in ancient Greece and Rome. They were the oldest of the medical sects of antiquity. They derived their name from dogma, a philosophical tenet or opinion, because they professed to follow the opinions of Hippocrates, hence they were sometimes called Hippocratici. Thessalus, the son, and Polybus, the son-in-law of Hippocrates, were the founders of this sect, c. 400 BC, which enjoyed great reputation, and held undisputed sway over the whole medical profession, until the establishment of the Empiric school. After the rise of Empiric school, for some centuries, every physician counted himself under either one or the other of the two parties. The most distinguished among this school were Diocles of Carystus, Praxagoras of Cos, and Plistonicus. The doctrines of this school are described by Aulus Cornelius Celsus in the introduction to his De Medicina.

== Doctrines ==
The Dogmatic school held that it was necessary to be acquainted with the hidden causes of diseases, as well as the more evident causes, and to know how the natural actions and different functions of the human body take place, which necessarily assumes a knowledge of the interior parts.

They gave the name of hidden causes to those things which concern the elements or principles of which our bodies are composed, and the occasion of good or ill health. It is impossible, they said, for people to know how to set about curing an illness unless they know what it comes from; since there is no doubt that they must treat it in one way, if diseases in general proceed from the excess or deficiency of one of the four elements, as some philosophers supposed; in another way, if all the malady lies in the humours of the body, as Herophilus thought; in another, if it is to be attributed to the respiration, according to the idea of Hippocrates (perhaps alluding to the De Flatibus, which is generally considered spurious); in another, if the blood excites inflammation by passing from the veins which are meant to contain it into the vessels that ought only to contain air, and if this inflammation produces the extraordinary movement of the blood that is remarked in fever, according to the opinion of Erasistratus; and in another, if it is by means of corpuscles which stop in the invisible passages and block up the way, as Asclepiades affirms to be the case. If this be granted, it must necessarily appear that, of all physicians, he will succeed the best in the cure of diseases who understands best their first origin and cause.

The Dogmatic school did not deny the necessity of experiments; but they said that these experiments could not be made, and never had been made, but by reasoning. They added, that it is probable that the first people who applied themselves to medicine, did not recommend to their patients the first thing that came into their thoughts, but that they deliberated about it, and that experiment and use then let them know if they had reasoned justly or not. It mattered little, they said, that people declared that the greater number of remedies had been the subject of experiment from the first, provided they confessed that these experiments were the results of the reasoning of those who tried the remedies. They went on to say, that we often see new sorts of diseases break out, for which neither experiment nor custom has yet found out any cure; and that, therefore, it is necessary to observe where they came from and how they first began, for otherwise no one can tell why, in such an emergency, one should make use of one remedy rather than another. Such are the reasons why a physician ought to try to discover the hidden causes of diseases.

As for the evident causes, which are such as can easily be discovered by anybody, and where one has only to know if the illness proceeds from heat or from cold, from having eaten too little or too much, etc., they said it was necessary to inform one's self of all of that, make on it the suitable reflections; but they did not think that one ought to stop there without going any further.

They said also, in regard to the natural actions, that it was necessary to know wherefore and in what manner we receive the air into our lungs, and why we afterward expire it; why food is taken into the body, how it is there prepared, and then distributed through every part of it; why the arteries are subject to pulsation; what is the cause of sleep, wakefulness, etc.; and they maintained that people could not cure diseases relating to these many functions unless they were able to explain these phenomena.

Lastly, they maintained that as the principal pains and diseases proceed from the internal parts, it is impossible for people to administer any remedy unless they are acquainted with these parts. They therefore thought that it was necessary to dissect dead bodies, for it was not possible to treat sick organs if one did not understand the nature of healthy organs.

== See also ==
- Methodic school – School of medicine in ancient Greece and Rome
- Empiric school – School of medicine in ancient Greece and Rome
