= Draco (physician) =

Draco (or Dracon, Greek: Δράκον) was the name of several physicians in the family of Hippocrates.

- Draco I. Lived 5th to 4th centuries BC, was the son of Hippocrates, the famous physician (Hippocrates II). He was the brother of Thessalus. Galen tells us that some of the writings of Hippocrates was attributed to his son Draco.
- Draco II. According to the Suda, the son of Thessalus and grandson of Hippocrates II. He was the father of Hippocrates IV, and would have been the brother of Hippocrates III. He would have lived in the 4th century BC.
- Draco III. According to the Suda, the son of Hippocrates IV.

There may, however, be some confusion in the Suda, and it is possible that these three physicians are not all distinct persons.
