= Feed a cold, starve a fever =

Old adage about curing illness

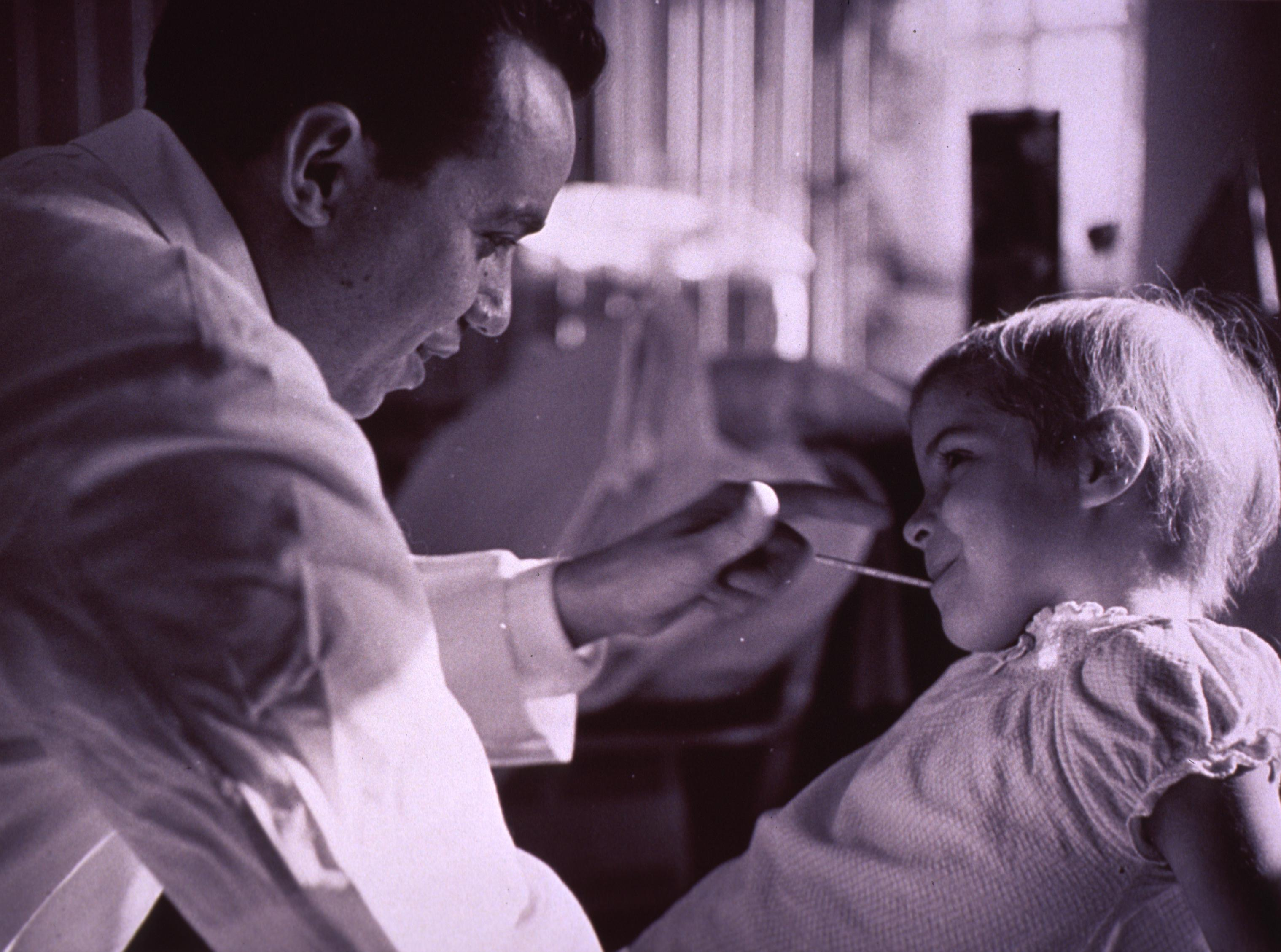
Physician taking the temperature of a young patient

"Feed a cold, starve a fever" is an adage or a wives' tale which attempts to instruct people how to deal with illness. The adage dates to the time of Hippocrates when fever was not well understood. His idea was the fever was the disease, and starving the sick person would starve the disease.

The adage states that eating will help cure a cold; not eating will help cure a fever. Scientific medicine does not support this advice, instead recommending rest and hydration. Adequate nutrition is required for the immune system to fight any infection, but no evidence supports any high dose supplements except potentially zinc.

== Background ==
Going back to the time of Hippocrates, many people thought that fever was a disease in and of itself. His treatment of patients with fever was said to be starvation. The Greek physician has been credited with coming up with the idea, "Feed a cold and starve a fever". Hippocrates thought that starving the fever was a way to starve the disease. He said "The more you feed a diseased body, the worse you make it."

Some scholars believe that the interpretation of the adage is, "If you stuff a cold, you will have a fever to starve". Others interpret it literally. Nobody knows for certain where the phrase originated. The first known publication of the adage was in John Withals' 1574 book, A shorte dictionarie most profitable for yong beginners. In the book Withals includes the phrase, "Fasting is a great remedie of feuer".

== History ==
In a 1942 paper published by The Johns Hopkins University Press, the "feed a cold, starve a fever" adage was determined to be justified according to medical knowledge.

In BBC Science Focus, an article discussed the positive effects of a ketogenic diet on illness. But they also state that there "may be a thread of scientific truth to the old adage 'feed a cold, starve a fever". In 2002, what is believed to be the only study yet conducted into the adage was undertaken in The Netherlands. This appeared to support the belief, though was not large enough to draw conclusions about a population.

A 2007 New York Times article concluded, "There is little scientific evidence behind the notion of starving a cold and feeding a fever." A 2017 CNN article suggested that starving a fever is not a good idea. CNN quoted pediatric infectious disease expert Jon S. Abramson, as saying. "Feed a cold, feed a fever. Nurture your body, and never starve it". They also quoted Emory University internist Sharon Horesh Bergquist who agreed but also advised: "When you're sick, drink more than you think you need".

== Science ==
When a person is sick or has infection in their body, white blood cells release cytokines to fight infection. The cytokines affect the hypothalamus part of the brain which may arrest hunger resulting in a loss of appetite. In 2002, researchers in the Netherlands published a small-scale test in which 6 male participants were monitored following food consumption. They observed that consuming food correlated with increased levels of gamma interferon production, a cytokine that stimulates immune cells to respond to viral infections such as the cold, whereas fasting was followed by an increase in interleukin 4, used in the response to the bacterial infections which are a common cause of fever. Some scientists have said the results of the Dutch study have little merit because it was small-scale, and the results have not been replicated.

Ruslan Medzhitov, of the Yale School of Medicine, states that the lack of an appetite is a common condition during an illness. Medzhitov has discussed experiments on mice, where mice that were infected with Listeria bacteria died when they were made to eat. The animals that stopped eating naturally eventually recovered. Sugar (glucose) was determined to be detrimental: mice survived after being fed protein and fats but no glucose. Another study of mice infected with the flu virus showed that the infected mice survived when fed glucose. The flu-infected mice died when they were not given food.

Bergquist suggests that liquids are more important for recovery than eating. She said that if a cold or fever has altered a person's appetite they should not force feed; however, a sick body needs nutrition in order to assist the immune system.

== See also ==
- Fasting and longevity
- Tissue hydration
