= Hippocrates Otthen =

French physician

- Died: 3 November 1611
- Occupation: Physician

Hippocrates Otthen (died 3 November 1611), also d'Otthen and d'Othon, was a French physician.

== Biography ==
Otthen was descended of a noble family of Otthens in Alsace, but was educated and became doctor of medicine at the university of Montpellier, France. He came to England in the train of his further, the emperor's physician, who had been summoned by Queen Elizabeth. Pressed into the service of the Earl of Leicester, ‘who desired him to pertain unto him,' he continued in the latter's service for many years, both at home and in the Low Countries. He was admitted a licentiate of the Royal College of Physicians on 4 July 1589, being described as ‘vir doctus et practicator bonus.' On the death of Leicester he entered the service of the Earl of Essex, and, by Elizabeth's command, attended him in the wars of France and the expedition to Cadiz. After his return to England he was ordered by Elizabeth to attend Mountjoy in Ireland. He subsequently accompanied, in the same capacity of physician, the Earl of Hertford, the English ambassador to the Archduke of Austria. The rest of his life was spent in private practice. On 12 June 1609 he was incorporated M.D. at Oxford. He died on 3 November 1611, and was buried in the church of St. Clement Danes, London, where a monument, with inscription, was erected to his memory on the south aide of the chancel (see Stow, Survey of London, iv. 113). Otthen married Dorothy, a daughter of Roger Drew of Densworth in Sussex, esquire. After his death she married Sir Stephen Thomhurst of Kent, and died on 12 June 1620, aged 55. She was buried in Canterbury Cathedral, where a monument was erected to her memory.
