= Thessalus (physician) =

Late 5th-century Greek physician, son of Hippocrates

Thessalus (Greek: Θεσσαλός) was a physician from ancient Greece, and the son of Hippocrates, the famous physician. He was the brother of Draco, and father of Gorgias, Hippocrates III, and Draco II. He lived in the 5th and 4th centuries BC and passed some of his time at the court of Archelaus I of Macedon (reigned 413–399 BC). He was one of the founders of the Dogmatic school (Dogmatici) of medicine, and is several times highly praised by Galen, who calls him the most eminent of the sons of Hippocrates, and says that he did not alter any of his father's doctrines. No doubt when he performed the difficult task of preparing the writings of Hippocrates for publication after his death, he made some additions of his own, which were sometimes not quite worthy of that honour. He was also supposed by some of the ancient writers to be the author of several of the works that form part of the Hippocratic collection, which he might have compiled from notes left by his father.

One of the spurious letters attributed to Hippocrates is addressed to Thessalus, and there is an oration, Presbeutikos, supposedly spoken by Thessalus to the Athenians, in which he implores them not to continue the war against Cos, his native country, but this is also undoubtedly spurious. There is an epitaph of Thessalus in the Greek Anthology. His name occurs in many passages of Galen's writings, but chiefly in reference to the authorship of the different books De Morbis Popularibus.
