= Hippocrates =

Ancient Greek physician (c. 460 – c. 370 BCE)

Hippocrates of Kos
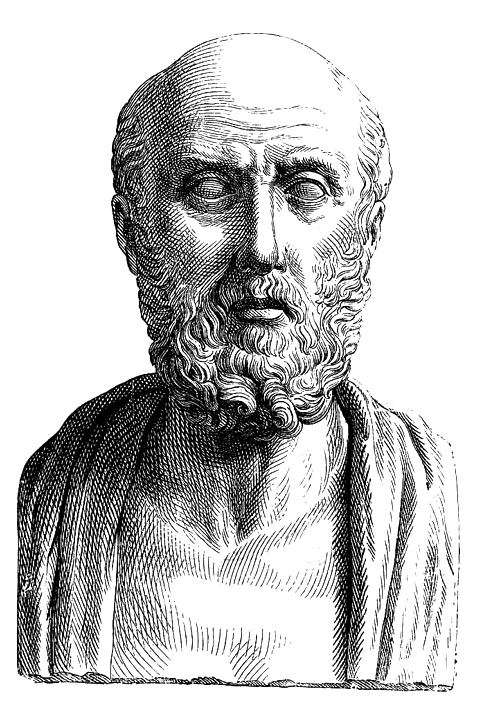
- A conventionalized image in a Roman "portrait" bust (19th-century engraving)
- Born: c. 460 BC; Kos
- Died: c. 370 BC (aged approximately 90); Larissa
- Occupation: Physician
- Era: Classical Greece

Hippocrates of Kos (/hɪˈpɒkrətiːz/; Ancient Greek: Ἱπποκράτης ὁ Κῷος, romanized: Hippokrátēs ho Kôios; c. 460 – c. 370 BC), also known as Hippocrates II, named after his grandfather Hippocrates I (also Hippocrates of Kos or Hippocrates I of Kos) was a Greek physician and philosopher of the classical period who is considered one of the most outstanding figures in the history of medicine. He is traditionally referred to as the "Father of Medicine" in recognition of his lasting contributions to the field, such as the use of prognosis and clinical observation, the systematic categorization of diseases, and the (later discredited) formulation of humoral theory. His studies set out the basic ideas of modern-day specialties, including surgery, urology, neurology, acute medicine and orthopedics, and advanced the systematic study of clinical medicine.

The Hippocratic school of medicine revolutionized ancient Greek medicine, establishing it as a discipline distinct from other fields with which it had traditionally been associated (theurgy and philosophy), thus establishing medicine as a profession. Hippocrates is also widely recognized for his contributions to medical ethics, being credited with the Hippocratic Oath that remains in use today. Works associated with Hippocrates, called the Hippocratic Corpus, also summed up the medical knowledge of previous schools, and prescribed acceptable practices for physicians.

Nevertheless, very little is known concretely about what Hippocrates himself thought, wrote and did, because his achievements were often conflated with those of the practitioners of Hippocratic medicine and the writers of the Hippocratic Corpus.

== Biography ==
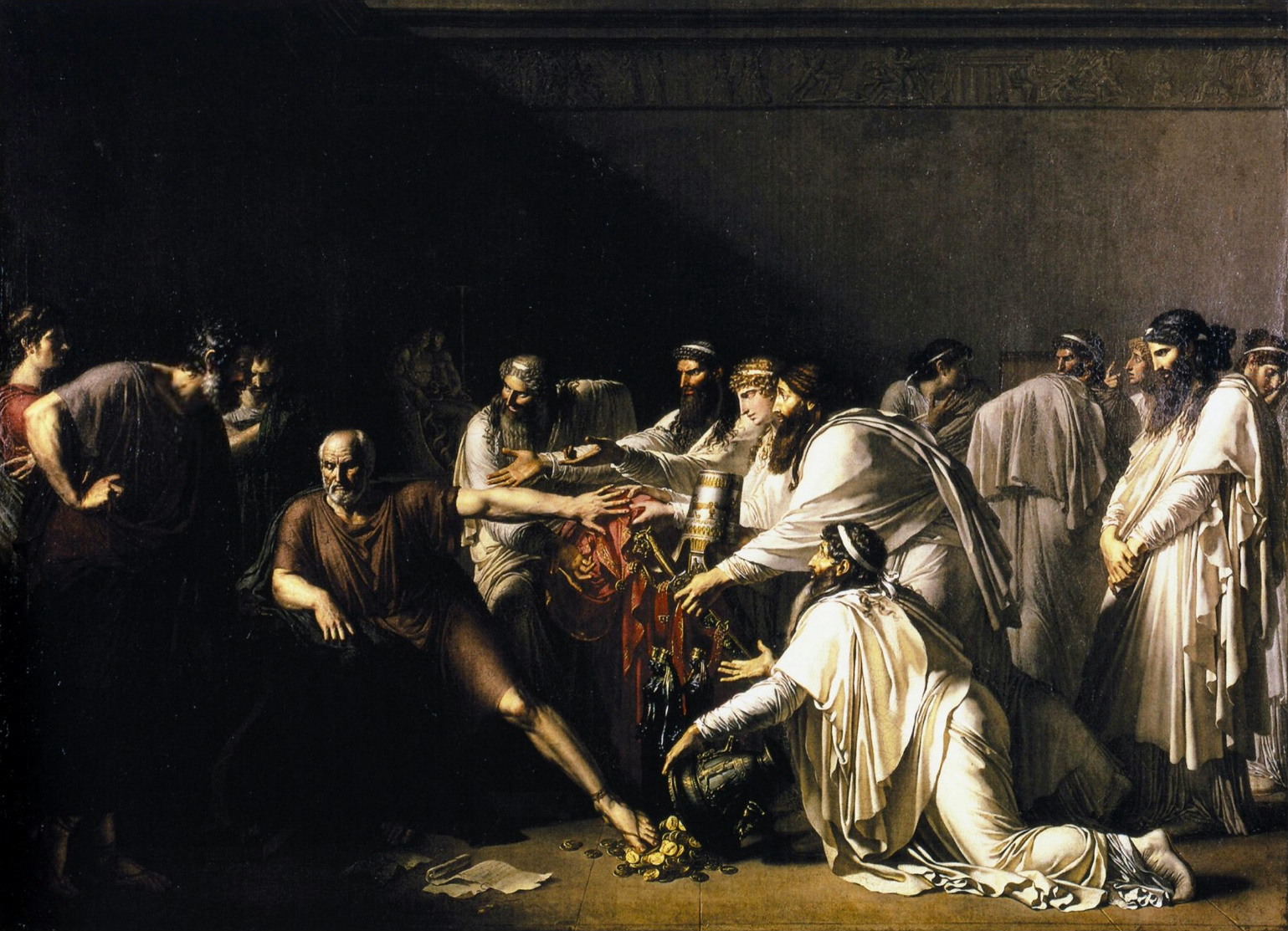
Illustration of the story of Hippocrates refusing the presents of the Achaemenid Emperor Artaxerxes, who was asking for his services. Hippocrates Refusing the Gifts of Artaxerxes by Girodet, 1792.

Historians agree that Hippocrates was born around the year 460 BC on the Greek island of Kos; other biographical information, however, is likely to be untrue.

Soranus of Ephesus, a 2nd-century Greek physician, was Hippocrates's first biographer and is the source of most personal information about him. Later biographies are in the Suda of the 10th century AD, and in the works of John Tzetzes, which date from the 12th century AD. Hippocrates is mentioned in passing in the writings of two contemporaries: in Plato's dialogues Protagoras and Phaedrus, and in Aristotle's Politics, all of which date from the 4th century BC.

Soranus wrote that Hippocrates's father was Heraclides, a physician, and his mother was Praxitela, daughter of Tizane. The two sons of Hippocrates, Thessalus and Draco, and his son-in-law, Polybus, were his students. According to Galen, a later physician, Polybus was Hippocrates's true successor, while Thessalus and Draco each had a son named Hippocrates (Hippocrates III and IV).

Soranus said that Hippocrates learned medicine from his father and grandfather (Hippocrates I), and studied other subjects with Democritus and Gorgias. Hippocrates was probably trained at the asklepieion of Kos, and took lessons from the Thracian physician Herodicus of Selymbria. Plato mentions Hippocrates in two of his dialogues: in Protagoras, Plato describes Hippocrates as "Hippocrates of Kos, the Asclepiad"; while in Phaedrus, Plato suggests that "Hippocrates the Asclepiad" thought that a complete knowledge of the nature of the body was necessary for medicine. Hippocrates taught and practiced medicine throughout his life, traveling at least as far as Thessaly, Thrace, and the Sea of Marmara. Several different accounts of his death exist. He died, probably in Larissa, at the age of 83, 85 or 90, though some say he lived to be well over 100.

== Hippocratic theory ==
It is thus with regard to the disease called Sacred: it appears to me to be nowise more divine nor more sacred than other diseases, but has a natural cause from the originates like other affections. Men regard its nature and cause as divine from ignorance and wonder...

— Hippocrates, On the Sacred Disease (epilepsy)

Hippocrates is credited as the first person to believe that diseases were caused naturally, not because of superstition and gods. He was acknowledged by the disciples of Pythagoras for allying philosophy and medicine. He separated the discipline of medicine from religion, believing and arguing that disease was not a punishment inflicted by the gods but rather the product of environmental factors, diet, and living habits. There is not a single mention of a mystical illness in the entirety of the Hippocratic Corpus. However, Hippocrates did hold many convictions that were based on incorrect anatomy and physiology, such as Humorism.

Ancient Greek schools of medicine were split into the Knidian and Koan on how to deal with disease. The Knidian school of medicine focused on diagnosis. Medicine at the time of Hippocrates knew almost nothing of human anatomy and physiology because of the Greek taboo forbidding the dissection of humans. The Knidian school consequently failed to distinguish when one disease caused many possible series of symptoms. The Hippocratic school or Koan school achieved greater success by applying general diagnoses and passive treatments. Its focus was on patient care and prognosis, not diagnosis. It could effectively treat diseases and allowed for a great development in clinical practice.

Hippocratic medicine and its philosophy are far removed from modern medicine, in which the physician focuses on specific diagnosis and specialized treatment, both of which were espoused by the Knidian school. This shift in medical thought since Hippocrates's day has generated serious criticism of their denunciations; for example, the French doctor M. S. Houdart called the Hippocratic treatment a "meditation upon death".

If you want to learn about the health of a population, look at the air they breathe, the water they drink, and the places where they live.

— Hippocrates, 5th century BC

Analogies have been drawn between Thucydides' historical method and the Hippocratic method, in particular the notion of "human nature" as a way of explaining foreseeable repetitions for future usefulness, for other times or for other cases.

=== Crisis ===
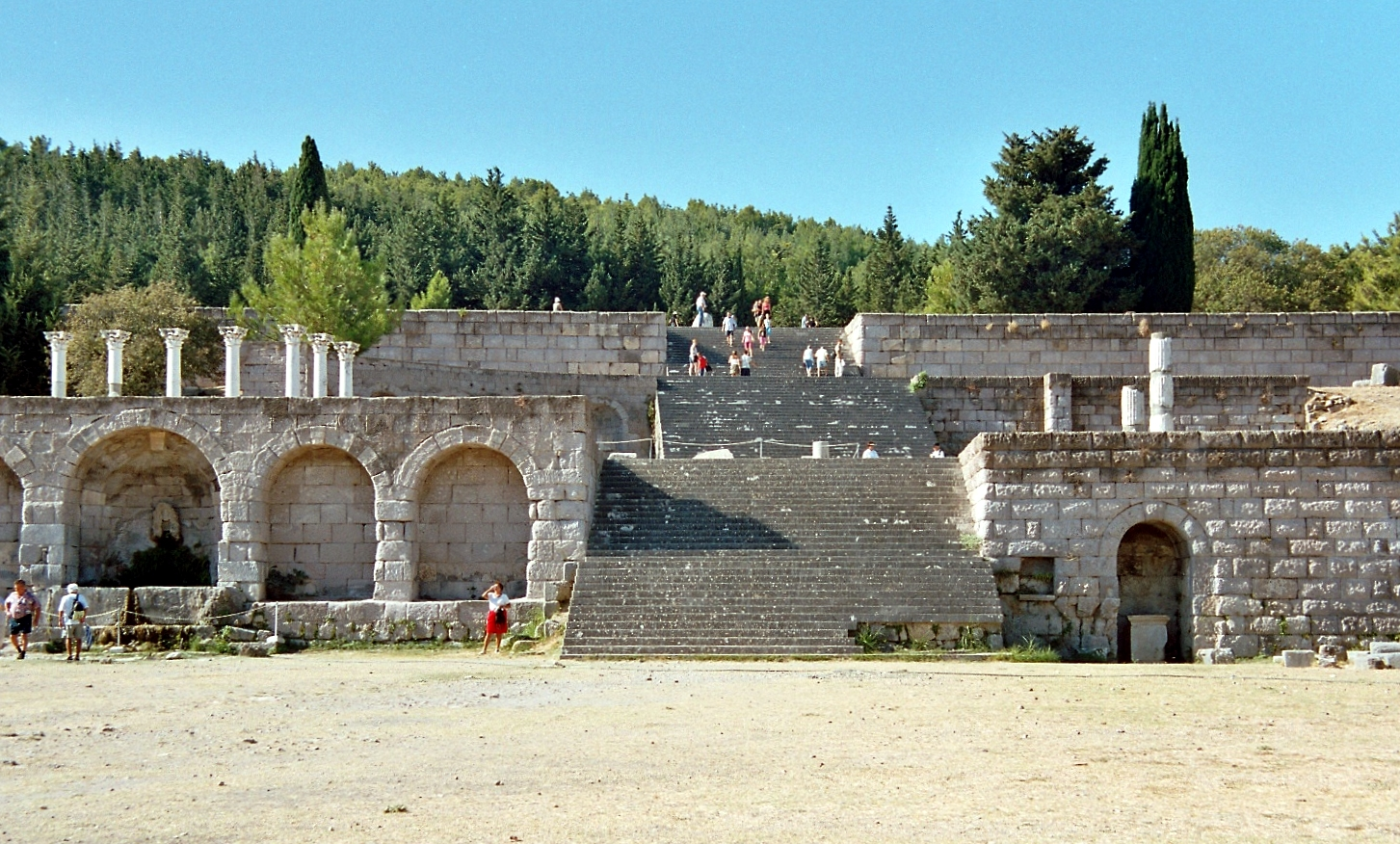
Asklepieion on Kos

An important concept in Hippocratic medicine was that of a crisis, a point in the progression of disease at which either the illness would begin to triumph and the patient would succumb to death, or the opposite would occur and natural processes would make the patient recover. After a crisis, a relapse might follow, and then another deciding crisis. According to this doctrine, crises tend to occur on critical days, which were supposed to be a fixed time after the contraction of a disease. If a crisis occurred on a day far from a critical day, a relapse might be expected. Galen believed that this idea originated with Hippocrates, though it is possible that it predated him.

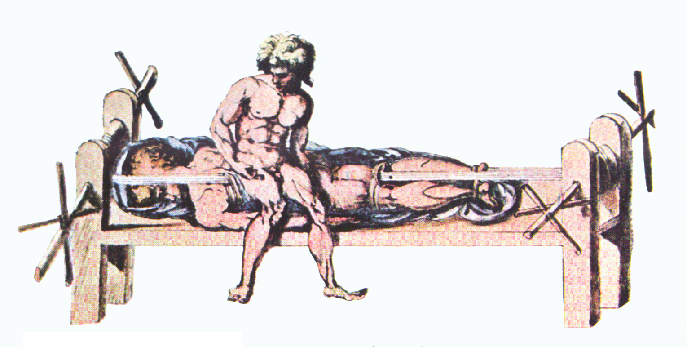
Illustration of a Hippocratic bench, date unknown

Hippocratic medicine was humble and passive. The therapeutic approach was based on "the healing power of nature" (Latin: vis medicatrix naturae). According to this doctrine, the body contains within itself the power to re-balance the four humours and heal itself (physis). Hippocratic therapy focused on simply easing this natural process. To this end, Hippocrates believed "rest and immobilization [were] of capital importance". In general, the Hippocratic medicine was very kind to the patient; treatment was gentle, and emphasized keeping the patient clean and sterile. For example, only clean water or wine were ever used on wounds, though "dry" treatment was preferable. Soothing balms were sometimes employed.

Hippocrates was reluctant to administer drugs and engage in specialized treatment that might prove to be wrongly chosen; generalized therapy followed a generalized diagnosis. Some of the generalized treatments he prescribed are fasting and the consumption of a mix of honey and vinegar. Hippocrates once said that "to eat when you are sick, is to feed your sickness". However, potent drugs were used on certain occasions. This passive approach was very successful in treating relatively simple ailments such as broken bones, which required traction to stretch the skeletal system and relieve pressure on the injured area. The Hippocratic bench and other devices were used to this end.

In Hippocrates's time it was thought that fever was a disease in and of itself. Hippocrates treated patients with fever by starving them out, believing that 'starving' the fever was a way to neutralize the disease. He may therefore have been the originator of the idea "Feed a cold, starve a fever".

One of the strengths of Hippocratic medicine was its emphasis on prognosis. At Hippocrates's time, medicinal therapy was quite immature, and often the best thing that physicians could do was to evaluate an illness and predict its likely progression based upon data collected in detailed case histories.

=== Professionalism ===
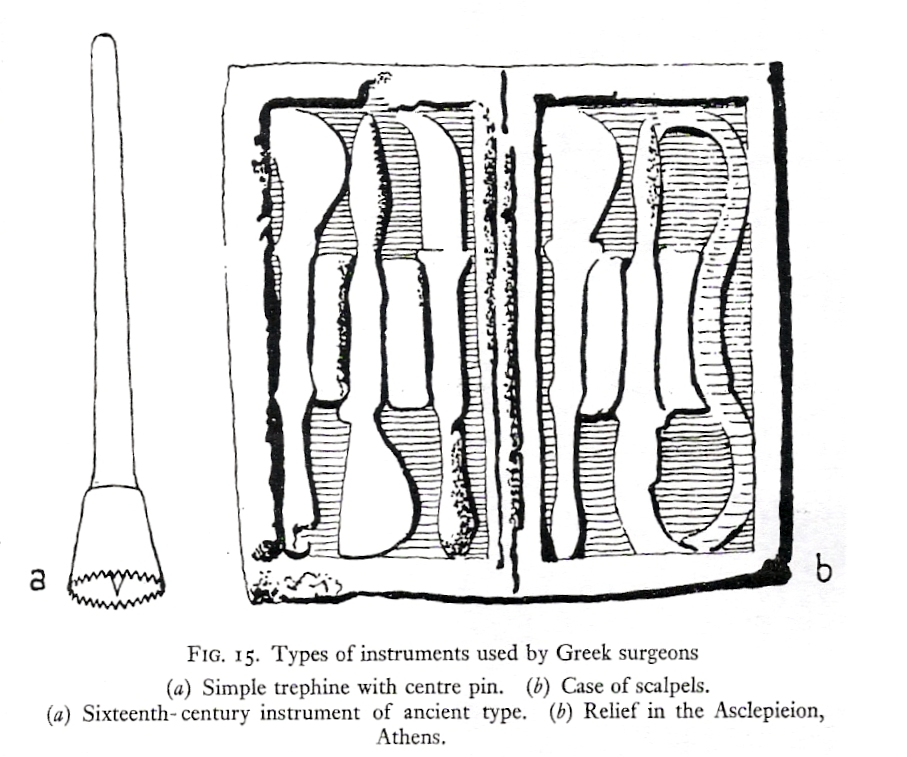
A number of ancient Greek surgical tools. On the left is a trephine; on the right, a set of scalpels. Hippocratic medicine made good use of these tools.

Hippocratic medicine was notable for its strict professionalism, discipline, and rigorous practice. The Hippocratic work On the Physician recommends that physicians always be well-kempt, honest, calm, understanding, and serious. The Hippocratic physician paid careful attention to all aspects of his practice: he followed detailed specifications for "lighting, personnel, instruments, positioning of the patient, and techniques of bandaging and splinting" in the ancient operating room. He even kept his fingernails to a precise length.

The Hippocratic school gave importance to the clinical doctrines of observation and documentation. These doctrines dictate that physicians record their findings and their medicinal methods in a very clear and objective manner, so that these records may be passed down and employed by other physicians. Hippocrates made careful, regular note of many symptoms including complexion, pulse, fever, pains, movement, and excretions. He is said to have measured a patient's pulse when taking a case history to discover whether the patient was lying. Hippocrates extended clinical observations into family history and environment. "To him medicine owes the art of clinical inspection and observation."

== Direct contributions to medicine ==
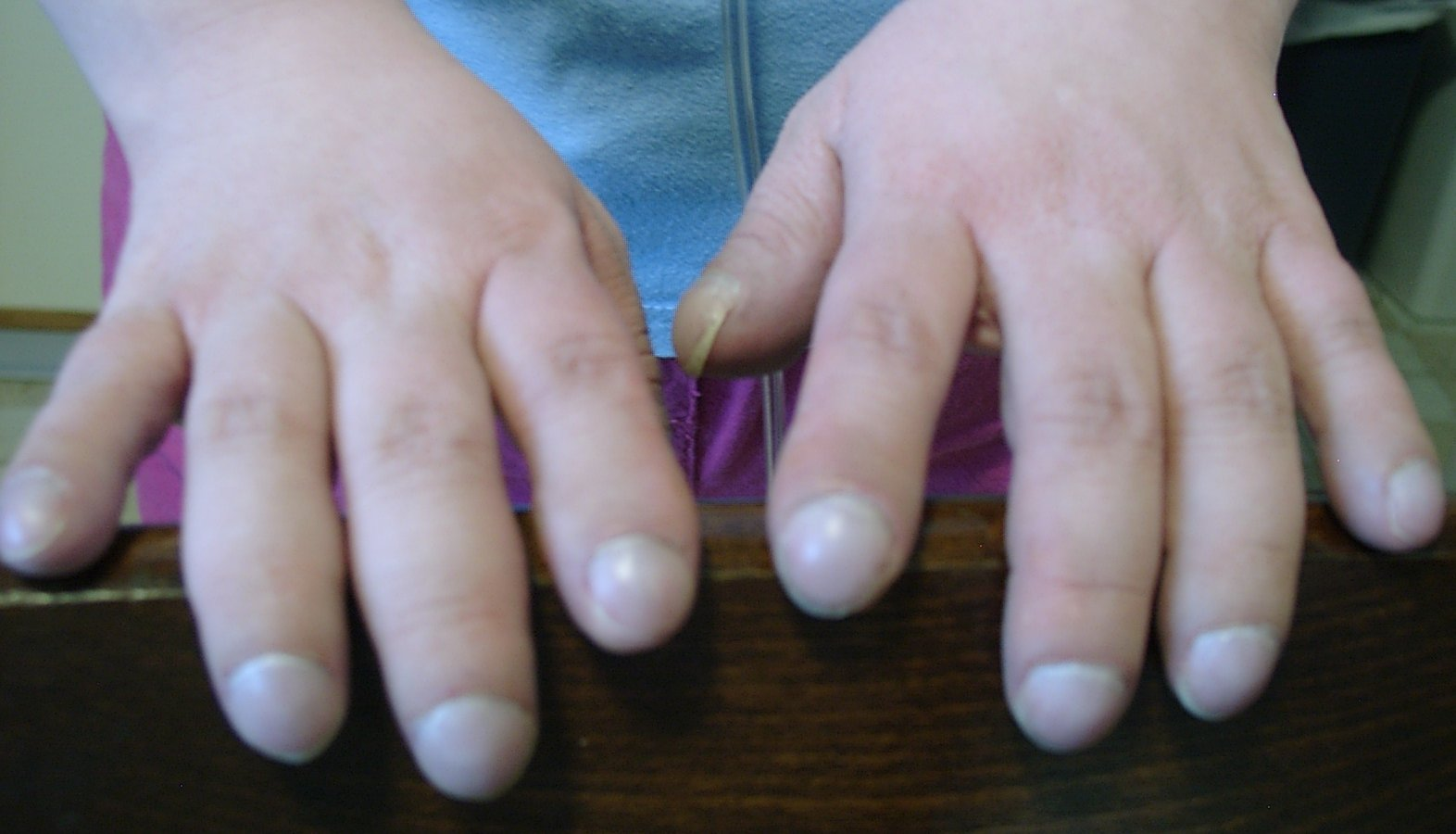
Clubbing of fingers in a patient with Eisenmenger's syndrome; first described by Hippocrates, clubbing is also known as "Hippocratic fingers".

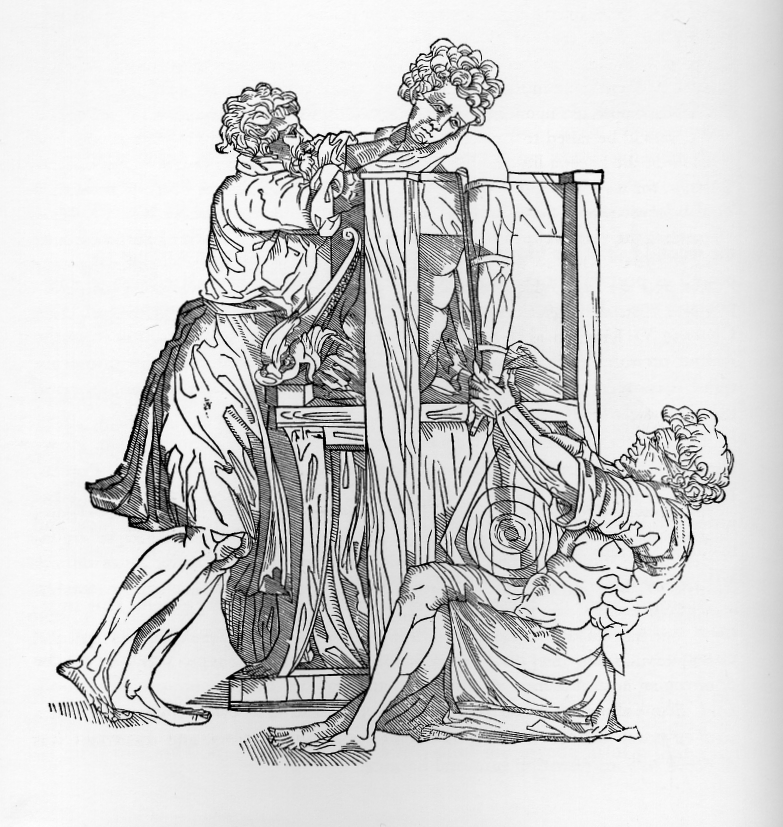
A woodcut of the reduction of a dislocated shoulder with a Hippocratic device

Hippocrates and his followers were the first to describe many diseases and medical conditions. He is given credit for the first description of clubbing of the fingers, an important diagnostic sign in chronic lung disease, lung cancer and cyanotic heart disease. For this reason, clubbed fingers are sometimes referred to as "Hippocratic fingers". Hippocrates was also the first physician to describe Hippocratic face in Prognosis. Shakespeare famously alludes to this description when writing of Falstaff's death in Act II, Scene iii. of Henry V.

Hippocrates began to categorize illnesses as acute, chronic, endemic and epidemic, and use terms such as, "exacerbation, relapse, resolution, crisis, paroxysm, peak, and convalescence." Another of Hippocrates's major contributions may be found in his descriptions of the symptomatology, physical findings, surgical treatment and prognosis of thoracic empyema, i.e. suppuration of the lining of the chest cavity. His teachings remain relevant to present-day students of pulmonary medicine and surgery. Hippocrates was the first documented chest surgeon and his findings and techniques, while crude, such as the use of lead pipes to drain chest wall abscess, are still valid.

The Hippocratic school of medicine described well the ailments of the human rectum and the treatment thereof, despite the school's poor theory of medicine. Hemorrhoids, for instance, though believed to be caused by an excess of bile and phlegm, were treated by Hippocratic physicians in relatively advanced ways. Cautery and excision are described in the Hippocratic Corpus, in addition to the preferred methods: ligating the hemorrhoids and drying them with a hot iron. Other treatments such as applying various salves are suggested as well. Today, "treatment [for hemorrhoids] still includes burning, strangling, and excising." Also, some of the fundamental concepts of proctoscopy outlined in the Corpus are still in use. For example, the uses of the rectal speculum, a common medical device, are discussed in the Hippocratic Corpus. This constitutes the earliest recorded reference to endoscopy. Hippocrates often used lifestyle modifications such as diet and exercise to treat diseases such as diabetes, what is today called lifestyle medicine.

Hippocrates helped establish several areas that would become specialized, contributing to them with his studies, those including surgery, urology, neurology, acute medicine and orthopedics. In neurology, he analyzed conditions such as hemiplegia, paraplegia, apoplexy, and epilepsy, the latter of which his studies contributed to the diminishing of its origin as a divine, and rather a common brain disorder. He laid the foundation of surgery with his studies, as his works described differing surgical techniques of general surgery, urology, orthopedics, and neurosurgery. He also used antiseptic techniques such as cleaning the surgical field with boiled water, salt, seawater, and natural perfumes. He also noted that a surgeon should have an organized medical bag of instruments. In urology, he studied urine in relation to acute and chronic diseases, and noted that stone formation is due to the quality of drinking water and to inflammation of the bladder neck, which is still true in modern urology.

Two popular but likely misquoted attributions to Hippocrates are "Let food be your medicine, and medicine be your food" and "Walking is man's best medicine". Both appear to be misquotations, and their exact origins remain unknown.

In 2017, researchers claimed that, while conducting restorations on the Saint Catherine's Monastery in South Sinai, they found a manuscript which contains a medical recipe of Hippocrates. The manuscript also contains three recipes with pictures of herbs that were created by an anonymous scribe.

== Hippocratic Corpus ==
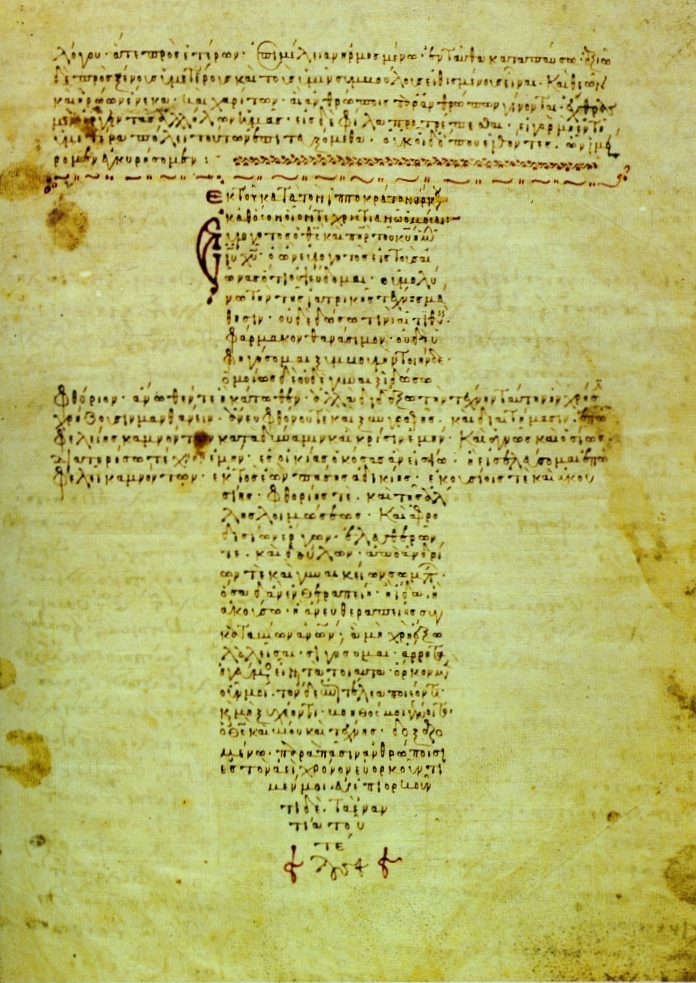
A 12th-century Byzantine manuscript of the Oath in the form of a cross

The Hippocratic Corpus (Latin: Corpus Hippocraticum) is a collection of around seventy early medical works collected in Alexandrian Greece. It is written in Ionic Greek. The question of whether Hippocrates himself was the author of any of the treatises in the corpus has not been conclusively answered, but modern debate revolves around only a few of the treatises seen as potentially authored by him. Because of the variety of subjects, writing styles and apparent date of construction, the Hippocratic Corpus could not have been written by one person (Ermerins numbers the authors at nineteen). The corpus came to be known by his name because of his fame; possibly all medical works were classified under 'Hippocrates' by a librarian in Alexandria. The volumes were probably produced by his students and followers.

The Hippocratic Corpus contains textbooks, lectures, research, notes and philosophical essays on various subjects in medicine, in no particular order. These works were written for different audiences, both specialists and laymen, and were sometimes written from opposing viewpoints; significant contradictions can be found between works in the Corpus. Among the treatises of the Corpus are The Hippocratic Oath; The Book of Prognostics; On Regimen in Acute Diseases; Aphorisms; On Airs, Waters and Places; Instruments of Reduction; On The Sacred Disease; etc.

=== Hippocratic Oath ===
The Hippocratic Oath, a seminal document on the ethics of medical practice, was attributed to Hippocrates in antiquity although new information shows it may have been written after his death. This is probably the most famous document of the Hippocratic Corpus. While the Oath is rarely used in its original form today, it serves as a foundation for other, similar oaths and laws that define good medical practice and morals. Such derivatives are regularly taken by modern medical graduates about to enter medical practice.

== Legacy ==
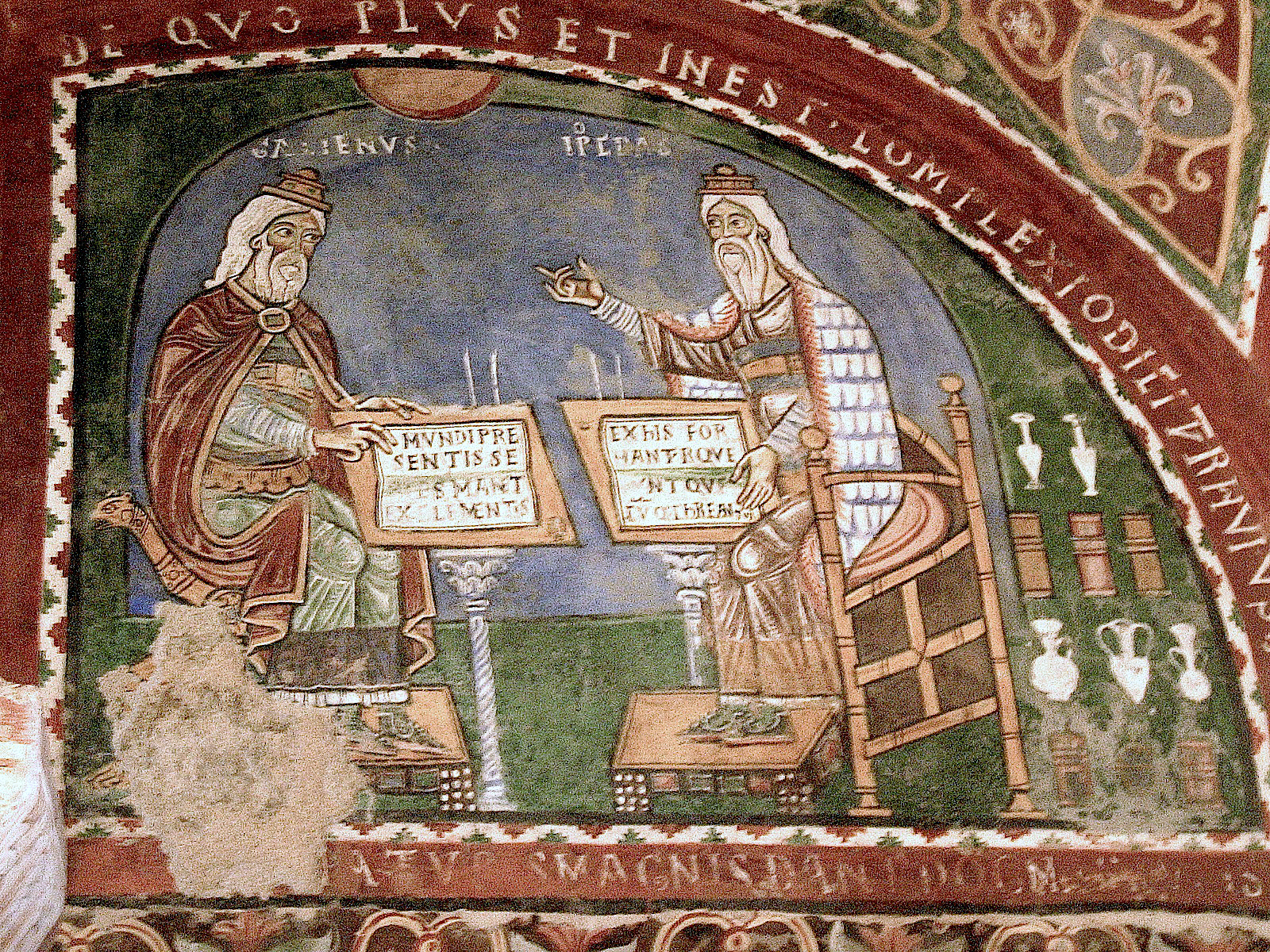
Mural painting showing Galen and Hippocrates. 12th century; Anagni, Italy

Although Hippocrates neither founded the school of medicine named after him, nor wrote most of the treatises attributed to him, he is traditionally regarded as the "Father of Medicine". His contributions revolutionized the practice of medicine; but after his death the advancement stalled. So revered was Hippocrates that his teachings were largely taken as too great to be improved upon and no significant advancements of his methods were made for a long time. The centuries after Hippocrates's death were marked as much by retrograde movement as by further advancement. For instance, "after the Hippocratic period, the practice of taking clinical case-histories died out," according to Fielding Garrison.

After Hippocrates, another significant physician was Galen, a Greek who lived from AD 129 to AD 200. Galen perpetuated the tradition of Hippocratic medicine, making some advancements, but also some regressions. In the Middle Ages, the Islamic world adopted Hippocratic methods and developed new medical technologies. After the European Renaissance, Hippocratic methods were revived in western Europe and even further expanded in the 19th century. Notable among those who employed Hippocrates's rigorous clinical techniques were Thomas Sydenham, William Heberden, Jean-Martin Charcot and William Osler. Henri Huchard, a French physician, said that these revivals make up "the whole history of internal medicine."

=== Image ===
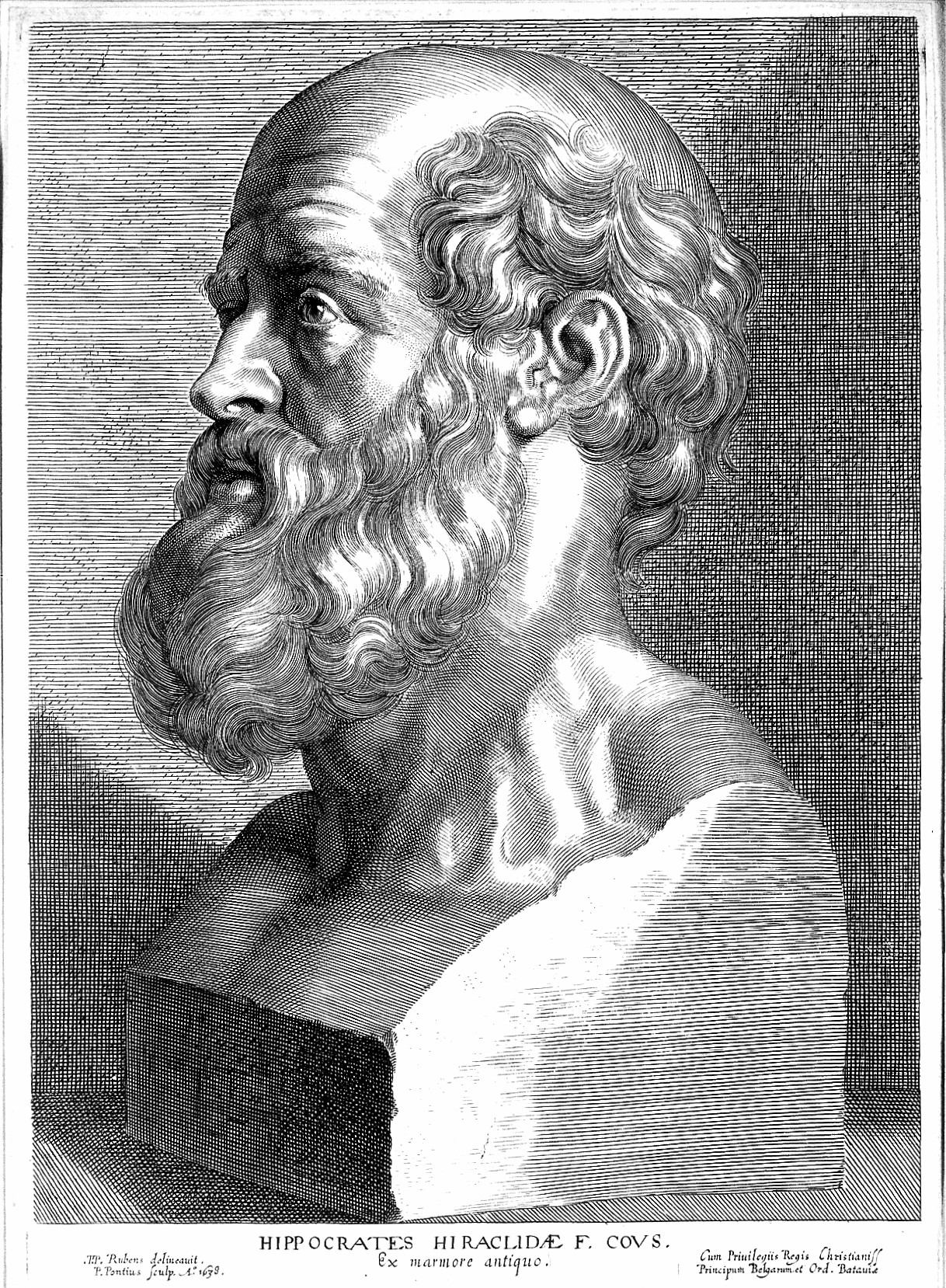
Engraving: bust of Hippocrates by Paulus Pontius after Peter Paul Rubens, 1638

According to Aristotle's testimony, Hippocrates was known as "The Great Hippocrates". Concerning his disposition, Hippocrates was first portrayed as a "kind, dignified, old country doctor" and later as "stern and forbidding". He is certainly considered wise, of very great intellect and especially as very practical. Francis Adams describes him as "strictly the physician of experience and common sense."

His image as the wise, old doctor is reinforced by busts of him, which wear large beards on a wrinkled face. Many physicians of the time wore their hair in the style of Jove and Asklepius. Accordingly, the busts of Hippocrates that have been found could be only altered versions of portraits of these deities. Hippocrates and the beliefs that he embodied are considered medical ideals. Fielding Garrison, an authority on medical history, stated, "He is, above all, the exemplar of that flexible, critical, well-poised attitude of mind, ever on the lookout for sources of error, which is the very essence of the scientific spirit." "His figure... stands for all time as that of the ideal physician," according to A Short History of Medicine, inspiring the medical profession since his death.

=== Legends ===
The Travels of Sir John Mandeville reports (incorrectly) that Hippocrates was the ruler of the islands of "Kos and Lango" [sic], and recounts a legend about Hippocrates's daughter. She was transformed into a hundred-foot long dragon by the goddess Diana, and is the "lady of the manor" of an old castle. She emerges three times a year, and will be turned back into a woman if a knight kisses her, making the knight into her consort and ruler of the islands. Various knights try, but flee when they see the hideous dragon; they die soon thereafter. This is a version of the legend of Melusine.

== Namesakes ==
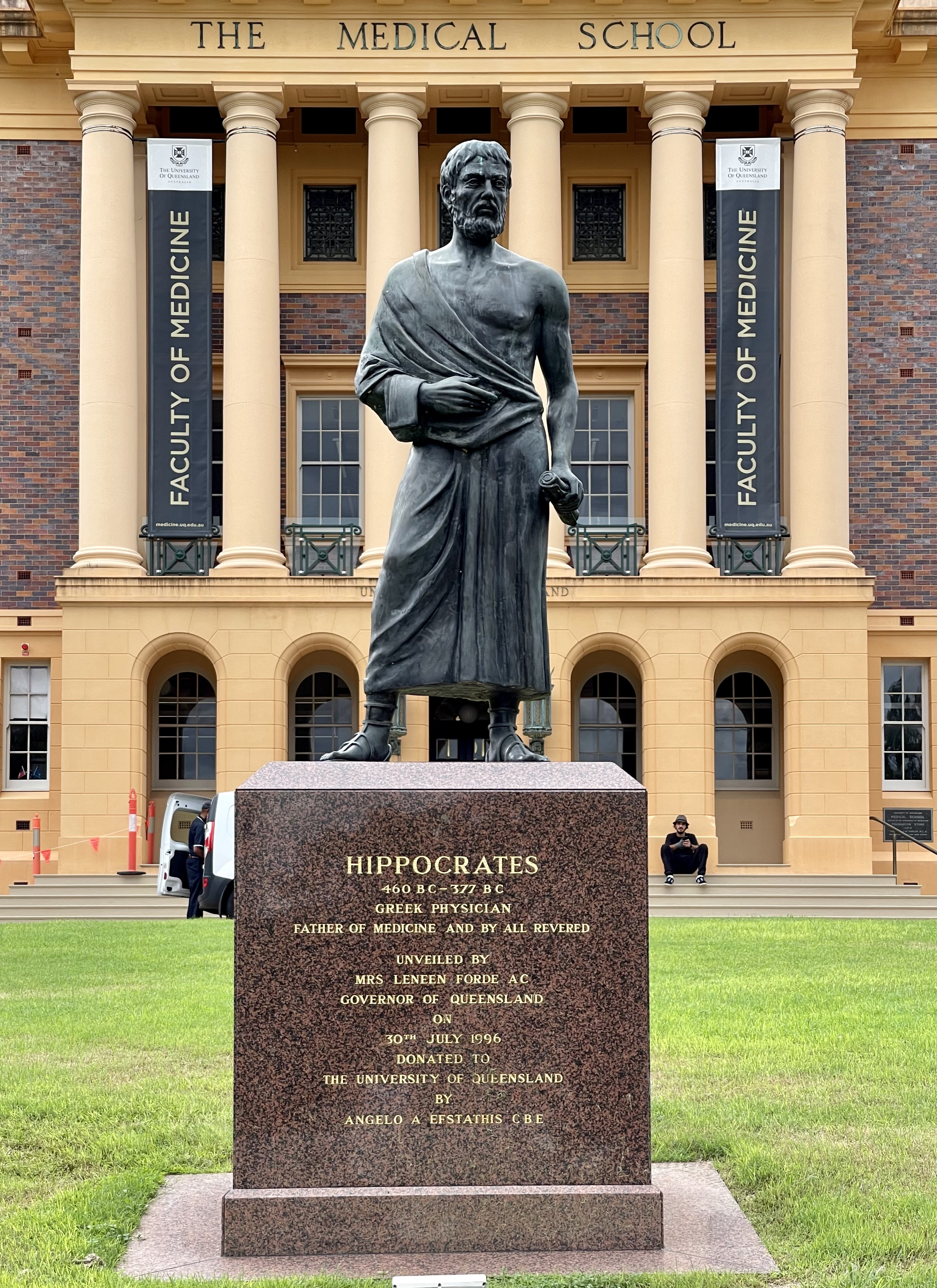
Statue of Hippocrates in front of the Mayne Medical School in Brisbane

Some clinical symptoms and signs have been named after Hippocrates as he is believed to be the first person to describe them. Hippocratic face is the change produced in the countenance by death, or long sickness, excessive evacuations, excessive hunger, and the like. Clubbing, a deformity of the fingers and fingernails, is also known as Hippocratic fingers. Hippocratic succussion is the internal splashing noise of hydropneumothorax or pyopneumothorax. Hippocratic bench (a device which uses tension to aid in setting bones) and Hippocratic cap-shaped bandage are two devices named after Hippocrates. Hippocratic Corpus and Hippocratic Oath are also his namesakes. Risus sardonicus, a sustained spasming of the face muscles may also be termed the Hippocratic Smile. The most severe form of hair loss and baldness is called the Hippocratic form.

In the modern age, a lunar crater has been named Hippocrates. The Hippocratic Museum, a museum on the Greek island of Kos is dedicated to him. The Hippocrates Project is a program of the New York University Medical Center to enhance education through use of technology. Project Hippocrates (an acronym of "High Performance Computing for Robot-Assisted Surgery") is an effort of the Carnegie Mellon School of Computer Science and Shadyside Medical Center, "to develop advanced planning, simulation, and execution technologies for the next generation of computer-assisted surgical robots." Both the Canadian Hippocratic Registry and American Hippocratic Registry are organizations of physicians who uphold the principles of the original Hippocratic Oath as inviolable through changing social times.

== Genealogy ==
Hippocrates's legendary genealogy traces his paternal heritage directly to Asklepius and his maternal ancestry to Heracles. According to Tzetzes's Chiliades, the ahnentafel of Hippocrates II is:

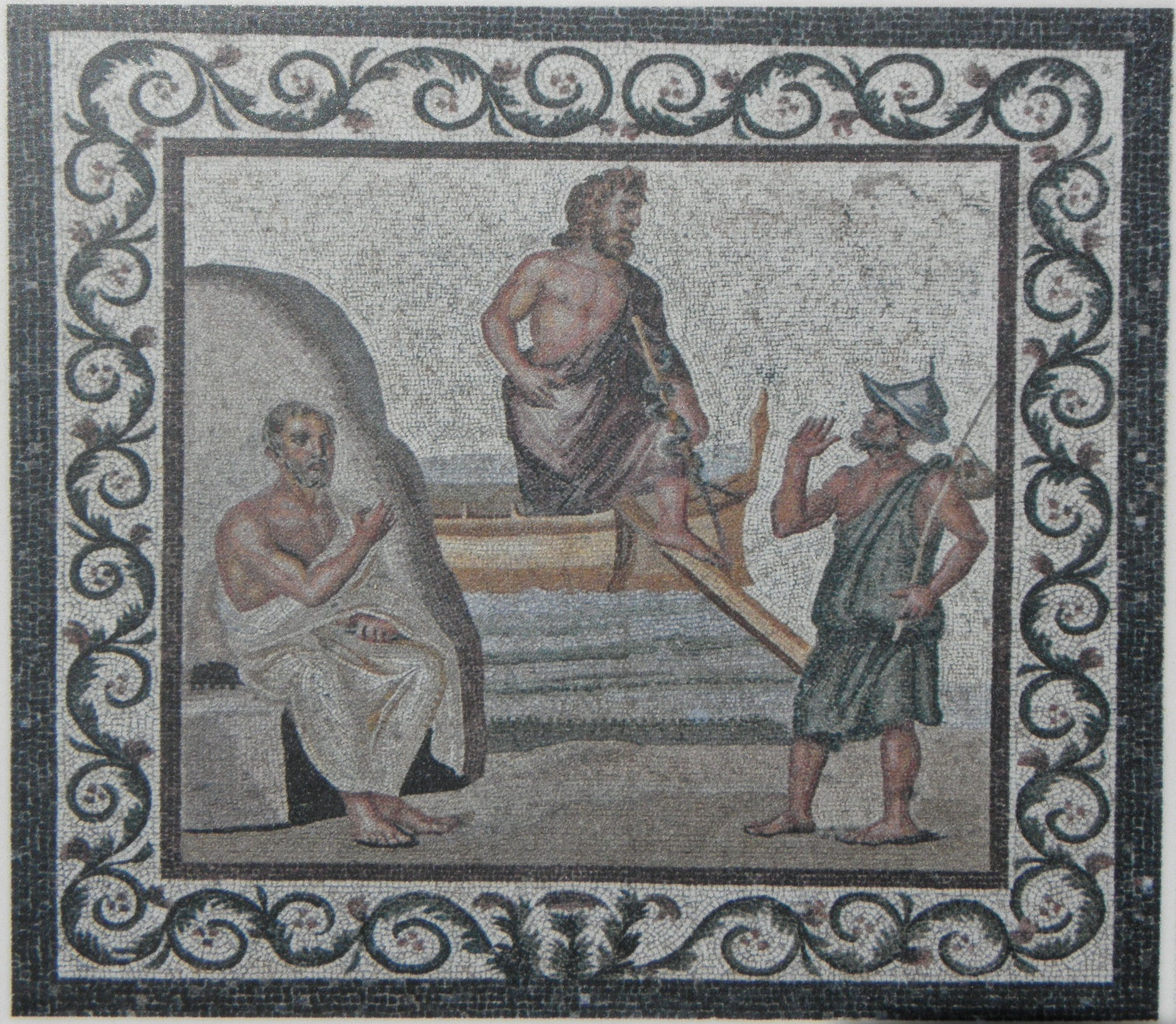
A mosaic of Hippocrates on the floor of the Asclepieion of Kos, with Asklepius in the middle, 2nd–3rd century

1. Hippocrates II.
2. Heraclides
4. Hippocrates I.
8. Gnosidicus
16. Nebrus
32. Sostratus III.
64. Theodorus II.
128. Sostratus, II.
256. Thedorus
512. Cleomyttades
1024. Crisamis
2048. Dardanus
4096. Sostratus
8192. Hippolochus
16384. Podalirius
32768. Asklepius

== See also ==
- Hippocrates Prize for Poetry and Medicine
