= History of anatomy =

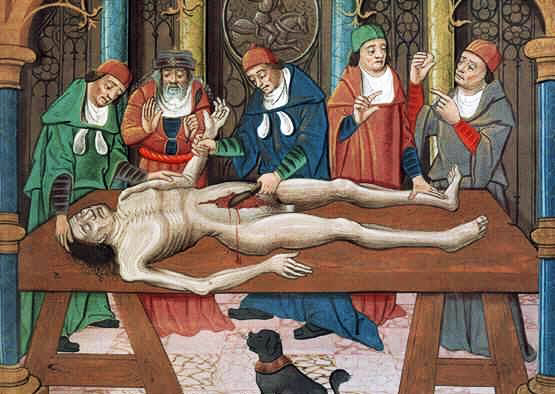
Dissection of a cadaver, 15th-century painting

The history of anatomy spans from the earliest examinations of sacrificial victims to the advanced studies of the human body conducted by modern scientists. Written descriptions of human organs and parts can be traced back thousands of years to ancient Mesopotamian civilizations, such as the liver clays and Egyptian papyri, where attention to the body was necessitated by their highly elaborate burial practices.

Theoretical considerations of the structure and function of the human body did not develop until far later, in ancient Greece. Ancient Greek philosophers, like Alcmaeon and Empedocles, and ancient Greek doctors, like Hippocrates and his school, paid attention to the causes of life, disease, and different functions of the body. Aristotle advocated dissection of animals as part of his program for understanding the causes of biological forms. During the Hellenistic Age, dissection and vivisection of human beings took place for the first time in the work of Herophilos and Erasistratus. Anatomical knowledge in antiquity would reach its apex in the person of Galen, who made important discoveries through his medical practice and his dissections of monkeys, oxen, and other animals.

Anatomical study continued to build on Galen's work throughout the Middle Ages, where his teachings formed the foundation of a medical education. The Renaissance (or Black Death) brought a reconsideration of classical medical texts, and anatomical dissections became once again fashionable for the first time since Galen. Important anatomical work was carried out by Mondino de Luzzi, Berengario da Carpi, and Jacques Dubois, culminating in Andreas Vesalius's seminal work De Humani Corporis Fabrica (1543). An understanding of the structures and functions of organs in the body has been an integral part of medical practice and a source for scientific investigations ever since.

== Ancient anatomy ==
=== Mesopotamia ===
The history of anatomy in Mesopotamia did not start in a single year but rather began to be formally recorded and studied starting around 2000 BCE. Early anatomical knowledge was developed through the examination of sacrificial animals and the practice of early surgery.

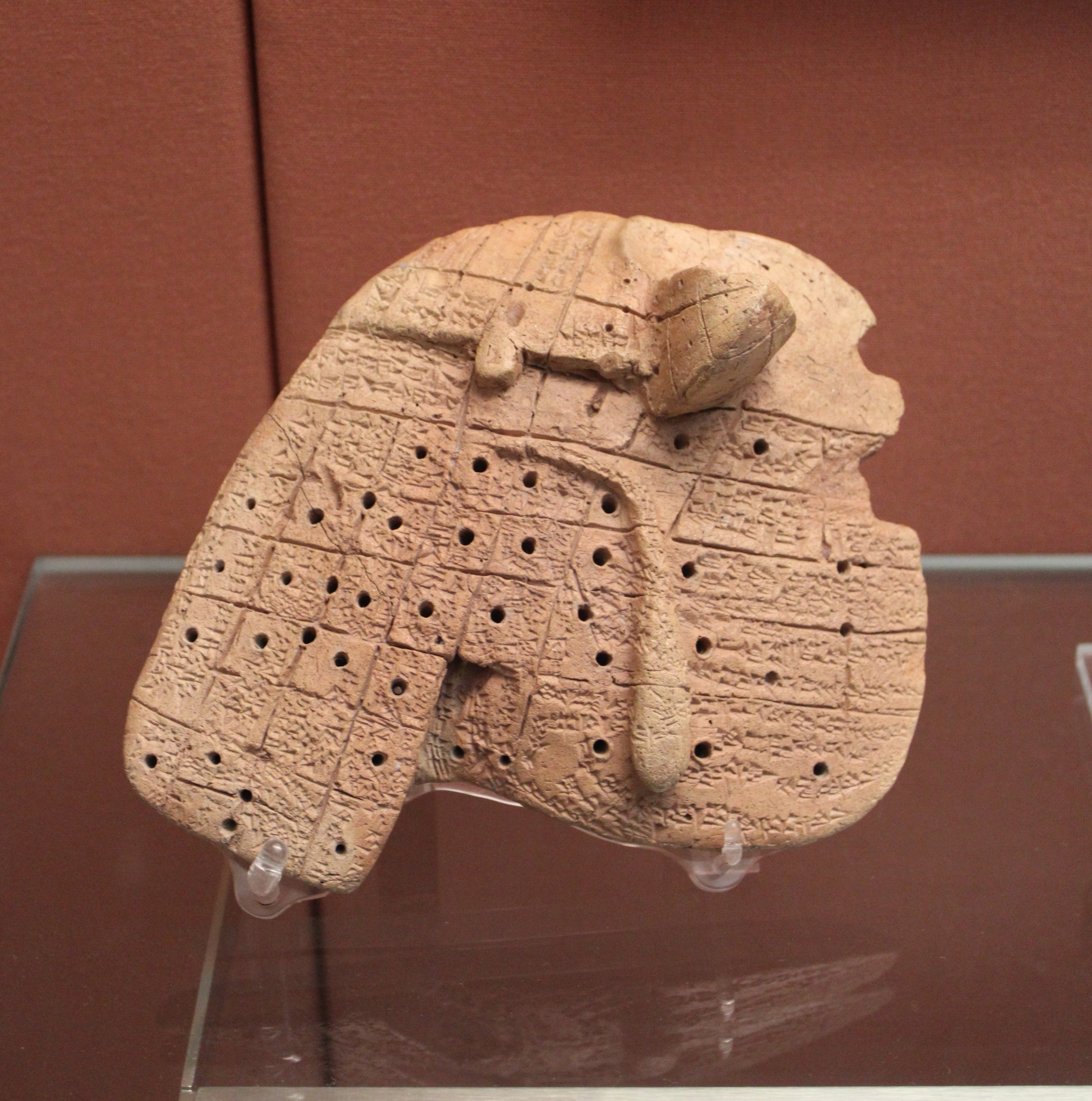
Model ME92668, held at the British Museum Department of the Middle East, inscribed model of a sheep liver, Early Babylonian Period.

Among several distinctive civilizations, empires, and kingdoms of the region of Mesopotamia, the liver was the single organ that summarized the custom of predicting the future among the Babylonians. The liver was considered the site of what they called the soul, the vital organ, and the central place of all forms of mental and emotional activity. It was not until much later that the heart began to serve this function in this civilization.

Mesopotamian clay liver models are part of the history of liver anatomy, few have survived to the present.

Model ME92668, held at the British Museum Department of the Middle East.

=== Egypt ===
Hieroglyph designating the brain or skull in the Edwin Smith papyrus.

The study of anatomy begins at least as early as 1600 BC, the date of the Edwin Smith Surgical Papyrus. This treatise shows that the heart, its vessels, liver, spleen, kidneys, hypothalamus, uterus, and bladder were recognized,and that the blood vessels were known to emanate from the heart. Other vessels are described; some carrying air, some mucus, and two to the right ear are said to carry the "breath of life", while two to the left ear, the "breath of death".The Ebers Papyrus (c. 1550 BC) features a treatise on the heart. It notes that the heart is the center of blood supply, and attached to it are vessels for every member of the body. The Egyptians seem to have known little about the function of the kidneys and the brain, and made the heart the meeting point of a number of vessels which carried all the fluids of the body—blood, tears, urine, and semen. However, they did not have a theory as to where saliva and sweat came from.

=== Ancient Greece ===
Much of the nomenclature, methods, and applications for the study of anatomy can be traced back to the works of the ancient Greeks. In the fifth-century BCE, the philosopher Alcmaeon may have been one of the first to have dissected animals for anatomical purposes in ancient Greece, and possibly identified the optic nerves and Eustachian tubes. Ancient physicians such as Acron, Pausanias, and Philistion of Locri may had also conducted anatomical investigations. Another important philosopher at the time was Empedocles, who viewed blood as the innate heat and argued that the heart was the chief organ of the body and the source of pneuma (this could refer to either breath or soul), which was distributed by the blood vessels.

Many medical texts by various authors are collected in the Hippocratic Corpus, none of which can definitely be ascribed to Hippocrates himself. The texts show an understanding of musculoskeletal structure, and the beginnings of understanding of the function of certain organs, such as the kidneys. The Hippocratic work, On the Heart, for example, contributed a great deal of knowledge to the field of anatomy, even as many of its assumptions regarding physiology were incorrect.

The philosopher Aristotle (4th century BCE), alongside some of his contemporaries, labored to produce a system that made room for empirical research. Through his work with animal dissections and biology, Aristotle engaged in comparative anatomy. Around this time, Praxagoras may have been the first to identify the difference between arteries and veins, though some specifics of the distinction he offered—such as his hypothesis that arteries carry air while veins carry blood—were incorrect.

In the Hellenistic period, the first recorded school of anatomy was formed in Alexandria from the late fourth century to the second century BCE. Beginning with Ptolemy I Soter, medical officials were allowed to cut open and examine cadavers for the purposes of learning how human bodies operated. The first use of human bodies for anatomical research occurred in the work of Herophilos and Erasistratus, who gained permission to perform live dissections, or vivisection, on condemned criminals in Alexandria under the auspices of the Ptolemaic dynasty. Herophilos in particular developed a body of anatomical knowledge much more informed by the actual structure of the human body than previous works had been. He also reversed the longstanding notion made by Aristotle that the heart was the "seat of intelligence", arguing for the brain instead. He also wrote on the distinction between veins and arteries, and made many other accurate observations about the structure of the human body, especially the nervous system.

=== Galen ===
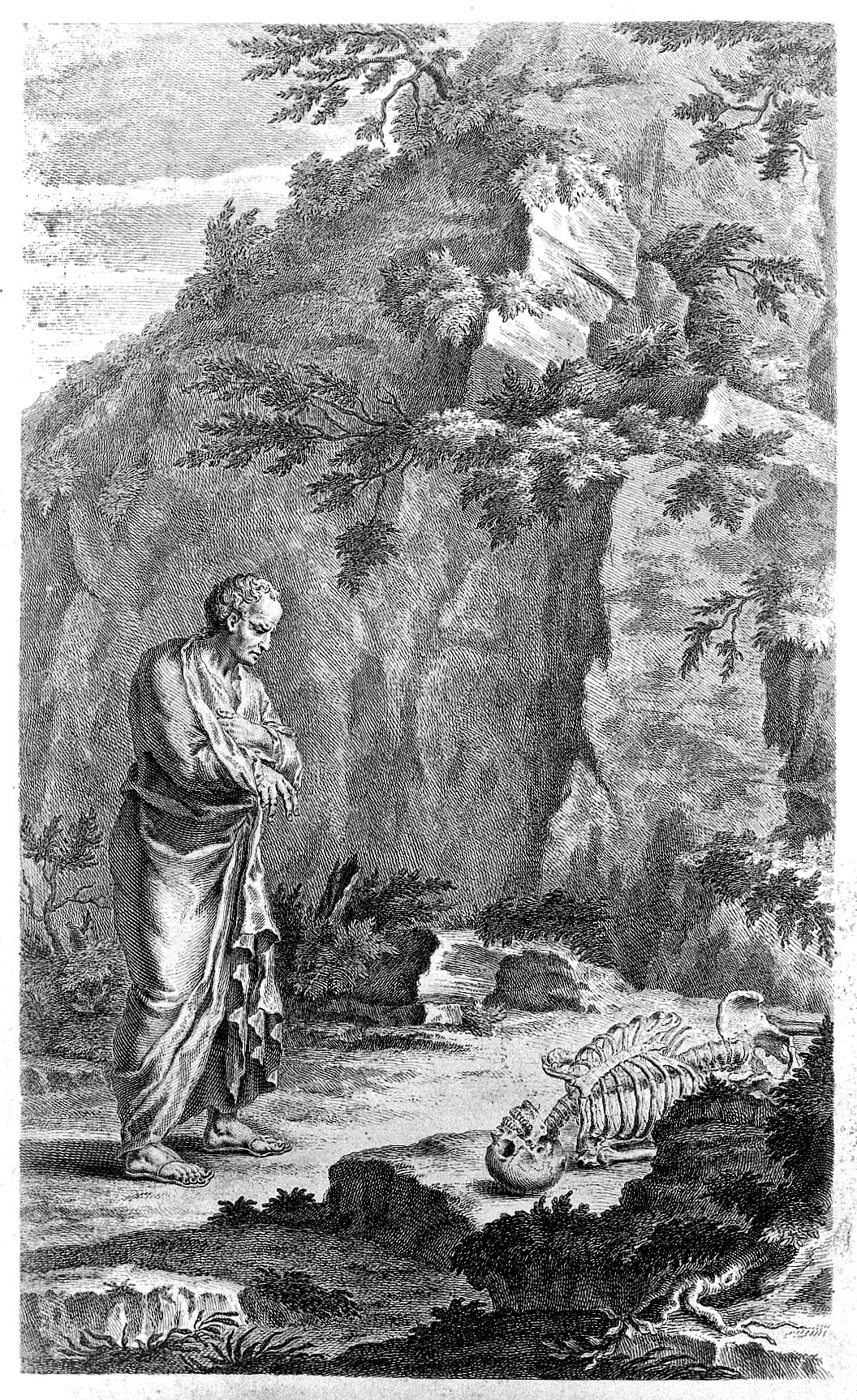
Galen examining a human skeleton.

The final major anatomist of ancient times was Galen, active in the second century CE. He was born in the ancient Greek city of Pergamon (now in Turkey) as the son of a successful architect, who gave him a liberal education. Galen was instructed in all major philosophical schools (Platonism, Aristotelianism, Stoicism, and Epicureanism) until his father, moved by a dream of Asclepius, decided he should study medicine. After his father's death, Galen searched abroad for the best doctors in Smyrna, Corinth, and finally Alexandria.

Galen compiled much of the knowledge obtained by his predecessors, and furthered the inquiry into the function of organs by performing dissections and vivisections on Barbary apes, oxen, pigs, and other animals. Due to a lack of readily available human specimens, discoveries through animal dissection were broadly applied to human anatomy as well. In 158 CE, Galen served as chief physician to the gladiators in his native Pergamon. Through his position, Galen was able to study all kinds of wounds without performing any actual human dissection, and was able to view much of the abdominal cavity. His study on pigs and apes, however, gave him more detailed information about the organs, and provided the basis for his medical works. Around 100 of these works survive today —the most for any ancient Greek author—and comprise 22 volumes of modern text.

Anatomy was a prominent part of Galen's medical education and was a major source of interest throughout his life. He wrote two great anatomical works, On anatomical procedure and On the uses of the parts of the body of man. The information in these tracts became the foundation of authority for all medical writers and physicians for the next 1300 years, until they were challenged by Vesalius and Harvey in the 16th century.

It was through his experiments that Galen was able to overturn many long-held beliefs, such as the theory that the arteries contained air, which it carried from the heart and lungs to all parts of the body. This belief was based originally on the arteries of dead animals, which had appeared empty. Galen was able to demonstrate that living arteries contain blood, but his error, which became the established medical orthodoxy for centuries, was to assume that the blood goes back and forth from the heart in an ebb-and-flow motion. Galen also made the mistake of assuming that the circulatory system was entirely open-ended. Galen believed that all blood was absorbed by the body and had to be regenerated via the liver using food and water. Galen viewed the cardiovascular system as a machine in which blood acts as fuel rather than a system that constantly recirculates.

Although Galen correctly identified some of the organs involved in the vascular system, many of their functions were not properly identified. Galen believed that the liver, for example, played a vital role in the circulatory system by creating all nutritious blood in the body. The heart, according to him, kept the body warm and mixed the two types of blood via pores in the wall that separates the left and right ventricles. Galen also proposed that the heart's warmth was what allowed the lungs to expand and inhale air. In contrast, Galen viewed the lungs as a cooling region in the body that also worked to expel sooty waste products from the body as they contracted. Additionally, Galen believed that the lungs kept the heart functioning properly by reducing the amount of blood in the right atrium—for if the right atrium contained too much blood, the pores in the heart would not dilate properly.

== Medieval to early modern anatomy ==
=== Abū Bakr al-Rāzī ===
Abū Bakr al-Rāzī (full name: أبو بکر محمد بن زکریاء الرازي, Abū Bakr Muḥammad ibn Zakariyyāʾ al-Rāzī), (Note: For the spelling of his Arabic name, see for example Kraus 1939. Sometimes it is also spelled زکریا (Zakariyyā) rather than زکریاء (Zakariyyāʾ), as for example in Dānish-pazhūh 1964, p. 1 of the edition, or in Mohaghegh 1993, p. 5. In modern Persian his name is rendered as ابوبکر محمدبن زکریا رازی (see Dānish-pazhūh 1964, p. 1 of the introduction), though instead of زکریا one may also find زکریای (see Mohaghegh 1993, p. 18).) c. 864 or 865–925 or 935 CE, (Note: For his date of birth, Kraus & Pines 1913–1936 give 864 CE / 250 AH (Goodman 1960–2007 gives 854 CE / 250 AH, but this is a typo), while Richter-Bernburg 2003 and Adamson 2021a give 865 CE / 251 AH. For his date of death as 925 or 935 CE / 313 or 323 AH, see Goodman 1960–2007; some sources only give 925 CE / 313 AH (Walker 1998; Richter-Bernburg 2003; Adamson 2021a).) often known as (al-)Razi or by his Latin name Rhazes, also rendered Rhasis, was a Persian physician, philosopher and alchemist who lived during the Islamic Golden Age. He is widely regarded as one of the most important figures in the history of medicine, and also wrote on logic, astronomy and grammar. In his book Doubts about Galen, al-Razi rejects several claims made by the Greek physician, as far as the alleged superiority of the Greek language and many of his cosmological and medical views.

Book for al-Mansur (Kitāb al-Manṣūrī)

Al-Razi dedicated this work to his patron Abū Ṣāliḥ al-Manṣūr, the Samanid governor of Ray. It was translated into Latin by Gerard of Cremona around 1180. A Latin translation of it was edited in the 16th century by the Dutch anatomist and physician Andreas Vesalius.

The anatomy part in Kitab Al-Ma'nsuri has 26 sections, being divided into sections about structures, such as bones, nerves, muscles, veins, and arteries, and organs such as the eyes, nose, heart, and intestines. He followed Galen in many of his anatomical descriptions, but also opposed—and improved—Galen's descriptions in many others. For example, he was the first to describe the recurrent laryngeal nerve as a mixed sensory and motor nerve, precisely described the circle of Willis, and distinguished nerves from tendons. He opposed Galen's concept that the brain, spinal cord, and ventricles comprise a single structure. He also corrected Galen by arguing that the stomach has three (not two) layers and the coccyx includes three (not five) bones (three—or four—is the number commonly given in current textbooks), and the correct relationship between the ureters and the urinary bladder. These examples of more accurate descriptions by Al-Razi could be a result of detailed observation of surgeries or, perhaps more likely, of human dissections, taking into account their level of detail and also the fact that he publicly stressed the importance of dissections in the medical field.

=== Ibn al-Nafīs ===
ʿAlāʾ al-Dīn Abū al-Ḥasan ʿAlī ibn Abī Ḥazm al-Qarashī (Arabic: علاء الدين أبو الحسن عليّ بن أبي حزم القرشي ), known as Ibn al-Nafis (Arabic: ابن النفيس), was an Arab polymath whose areas of work included medicine, surgery, physiology, anatomy, biology, Islamic studies, jurisprudence, and philosophy. He is known for being the first to describe the pulmonary circulation of the blood. The work of Ibn al-Nafis regarding the right sided (pulmonary) circulation pre-dates the later work (1628) of William Harvey's De motu cordis. Both theories attempt to explain circulation. 2nd century Greek physician Galen's theory about the physiology of the circulatory system remained unchallenged until the works of Ibn al-Nafis, for which he has been described as "the father of circulatory physiology".

As an early anatomist, Ibn al-Nafis also performed several human dissections during the course of his work, making several important discoveries in the fields of physiology and anatomy. Besides his famous discovery of the pulmonary circulation, he also gave an early insight of the coronary and capillary circulations.

=== Pre-Renaissance Europe ===
Throughout the Middle Ages in Europe, human anatomy was mainly learned through books and animal dissection. While it was claimed by 19th century polemicists, and still is claimed in some generalist works, that dissection was restricted after Boniface VIII passed a papal bull that forbade the dismemberment and boiling of corpses for funerary purposes, this claim has been debunked as a myth by modern historians of science.

For many decades human dissection was thought unnecessary when all the knowledge about a human body could be read about from early authors such as Galen. In the 12th century, as universities were being established in Italy, Emperor Frederick II made it mandatory for students of medicine to take courses on human anatomy and surgery. Students who had the opportunity to watch Vesalius in dissection at times had the opportunity to interact with the animal corpse. At the risk of letting their eagerness to participate become a distraction to their professors, medical students preferred this interactive teaching style at the time. In the universities the lectern would sit elevated before the audience and instruct someone else in the dissection of the body, but in his early years Mondino de Luzzi performed the dissection himself making him one of the first and few to use a hands on approach to teaching human anatomy. Specifically in 1315, Mondino de' Liuzzi is credited with having "performed the first human dissection recorded for Western Europe."

Mondino de Luzzi "Mundinus" was born around 1276 and died in 1326; from 1314 to 1324 he presented many lectures on human anatomy at Bologna university. Mondino de'Luzzi put together a book called "Anathomia" in 1316 that consisted of detailed dissections that he had performed, this book was used as a text book in universities for 250 years. "Mundinus" carried out the first systematic human dissections since Herophilus of Chalcedon and Erasistratus of Ceos 1500 years earlier. The first major development in anatomy in Christian Europe since the fall of Rome occurred at Bologna, where anatomists dissected cadavers and contributed to the accurate description of organs and the identification of their functions. Following de Liuzzi's early studies, 15th century anatomists included Alessandro Achillini and Antonio Benivieni.

=== Leonardo da Vinci ===
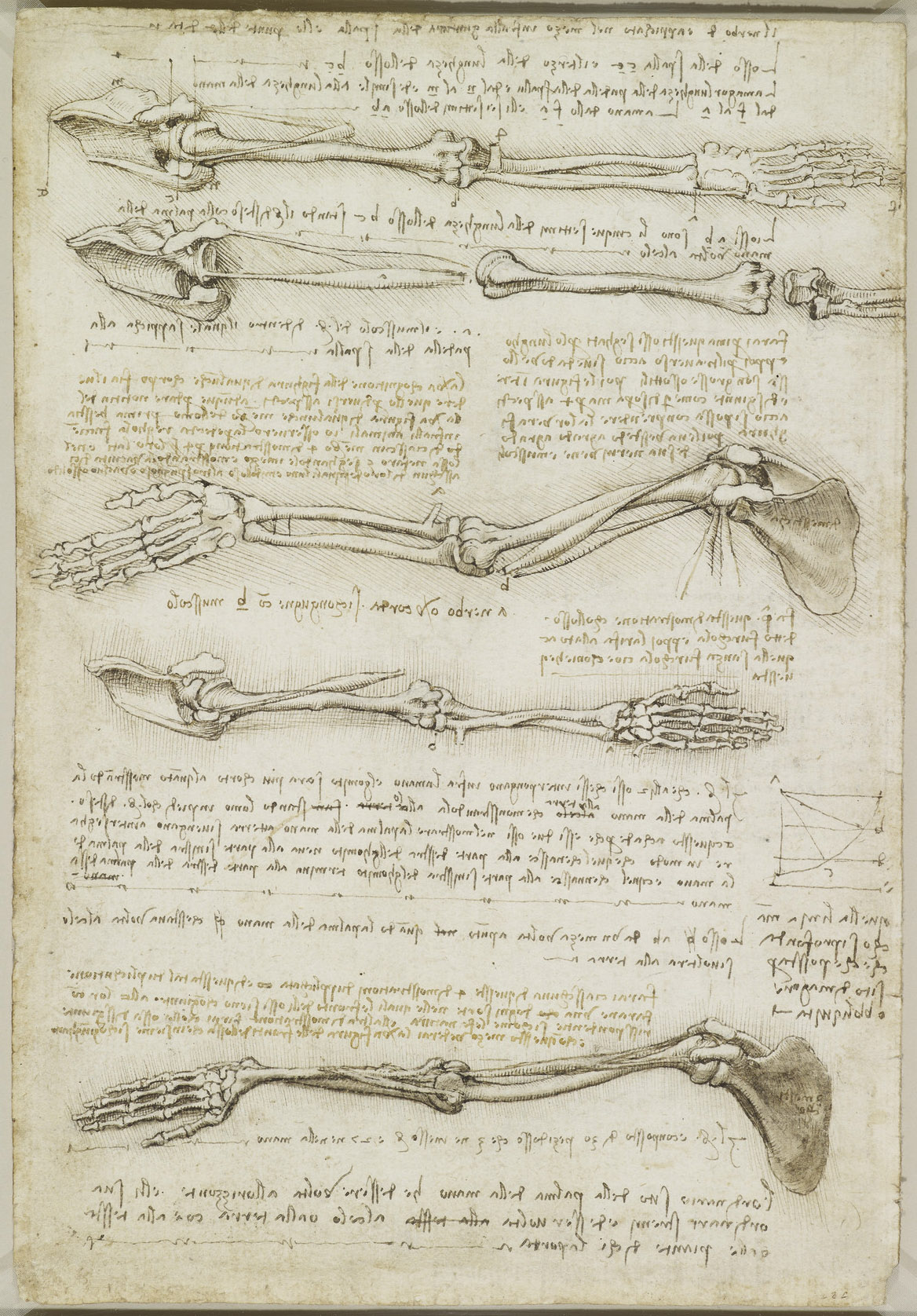
Anatomical study of the arm, by Leonardo da Vinci, c. 1510

Leonardo da Vinci (1452–1519) was trained in anatomy by Andrea del Verrocchio. In 1489 Leonardo began a series of anatomical drawings depicting the ideal human form. This work was carried out intermittently for over two decades. During this time he made use of his anatomical knowledge in his artwork, making many sketches of skeletal structures, muscles, and organs of humans and other vertebrates that he dissected.

Initially adopting an Aristotelian understanding of anatomy, he later studied Galen and adopted a more empirical approach, eventually abandoning Galen altogether and relying entirely on his own direct observation. His surviving 750 drawings represent groundbreaking studies in anatomy. Leonardo dissected around thirty human specimens until he was forced to stop under order of Pope Leo X.

As an artist-anatomist, Leonardo made many important discoveries, and had intended to publish a comprehensive treatise on human anatomy. For instance, he produced the first accurate depiction of the human spine, while his notes documenting his dissection of the Florentine centenarian contain the earliest known description of cirrhosis of the liver and arteriosclerosis. He was the first to develop drawing techniques in anatomy to convey information using cross-sections and multiple angles, although centuries would pass before anatomical drawings became accepted as crucial for learning anatomy.

None of Leonardo's Notebooks were published during his lifetime, many being lost after his death, with the result that his anatomical discoveries remained unknown until they were later found and published centuries after his death.

=== Vesalius ===
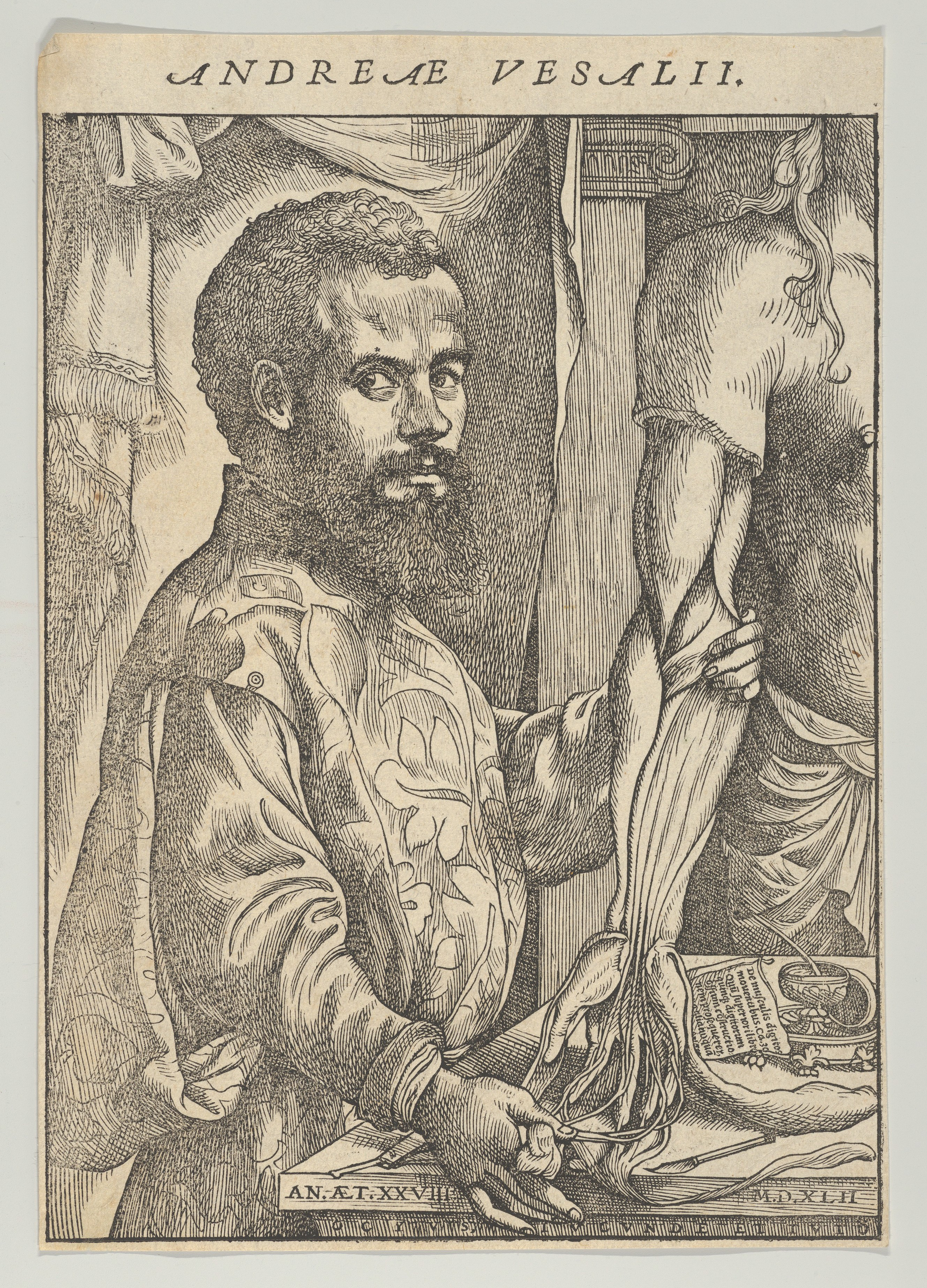
A portrait of Andreas Vesalius from De Humani Corporis Fabrica (1543)

The Galenic doctrine in Europe was first seriously challenged in the 16th century. Thanks to the printing press, all over Europe a collective effort proceeded to circulate the works of Galen and later publish criticisms on their works. Andreas Vesalius, born and educated in Belgium, contributed the most to human anatomy. Vesalius's success were due in large part to him exercising the skills of mindful dissections for the sake of understanding anatomy, much to the tune of Galen's "anatomy project" instead of focusing on the work of other scholars of the time in recovering the ancient texts of Hippocrates, Galen and others (which much of the medical community was focused around at the time).

Vesalius was the first to publish a treatise, De Humani Corporis Fabrica, that challenged Galen's anatomical teachings, arguing that they are based on observations of other mammals, not human bodies. The book included a detailed series of explanations and vivid drawings of the anatomical parts of human bodies. Vesalius traveled all the way from Leuven to Padua for permission to dissect victims from the gallows without fear of persecution. His superbly executed drawings are triumphant descriptions of the differences between dogs and humans, but it took a century for Galen's influence to fade.

Vesalius' work marked a new era in the study of anatomy and its relation to medicine. Under Vesalius, anatomy became an actual discipline. "His skill in and attention to dissection featured prominently in his publications as well as his demonstrations, in his research as well as his teaching." In 1540, Vesalius gave a public demonstration of the inaccuracies of Galen's anatomical theories, which are still the orthodoxy of the medical profession. Vesalius now has on display, for comparison purposes, the skeletons of a human being alongside that of an ape of which he was able to show, that in many cases, Galen's observations were indeed correct for the ape, but bear little relation to man. Clearly what was needed was a new account of human anatomy. While the lecturer explained human anatomy, as revealed by Galen more than 1000 years earlier, an assistant pointed to the equivalent details on a dissected corpse. At times, the assistant was unable to find the organ as described, but invariably the corpse rather than Galen was held to be in error. Vesalius then decided that he will dissect corpses himself and trust to the evidence of what he found. His approach was highly controversial, but his evident skill led to his appointment as professor of surgery and anatomy at the University of Padua.

A succession of researchers proceeded to refine the body of anatomical knowledge, giving their names to a number of anatomical structures along the way. The 16th and 17th centuries also witnessed significant advances in the understanding of the circulatory system, as the purpose of valves in veins was identified, the left-to-right ventricle flow of blood through the circulatory system was described, and the hepatic veins were identified as a separate portion of the circulatory system. The lymphatic system was also identified as a separate system at this time.

=== Anatomical theatres ===
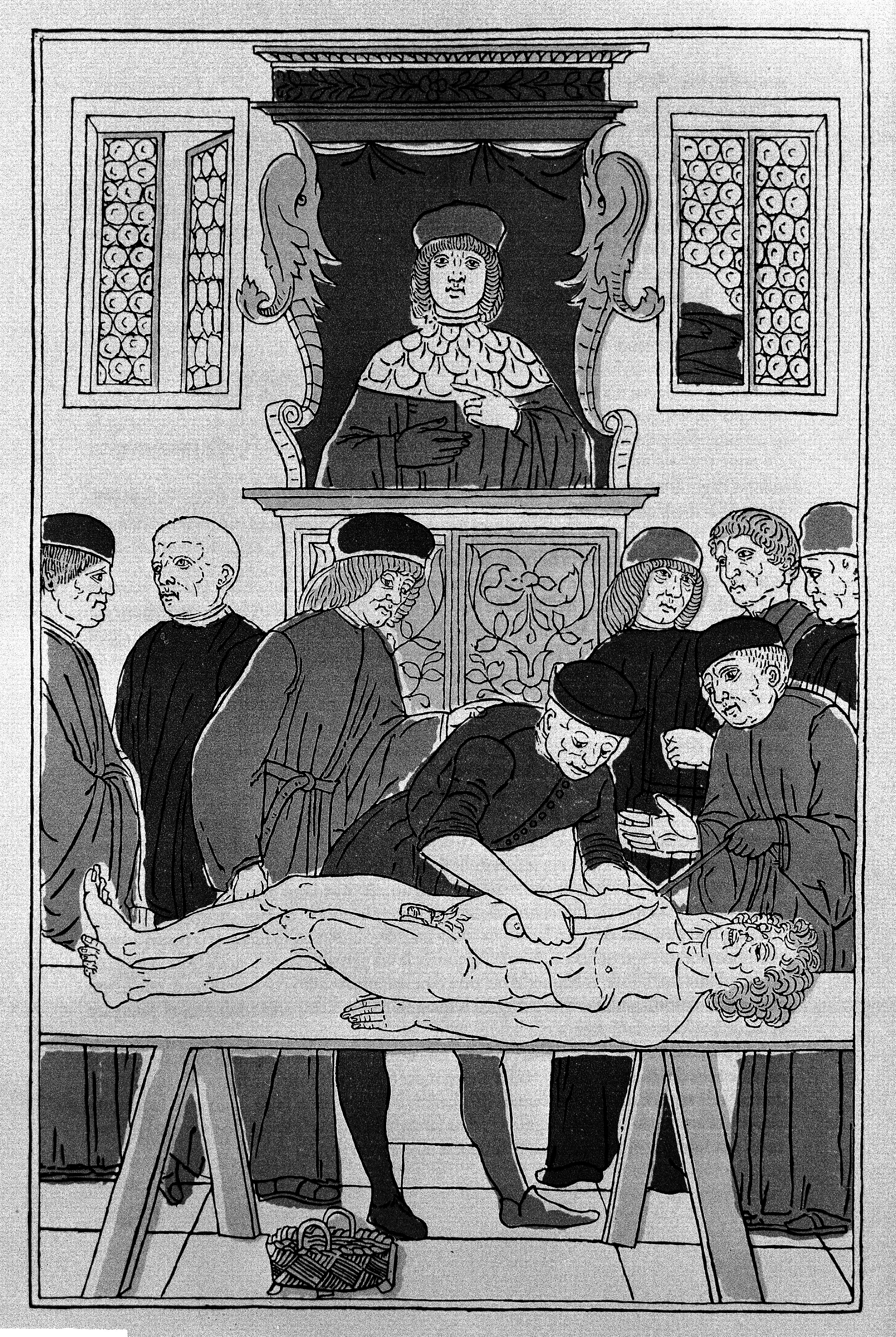
A woodcut of an anatomical dissection, from 1493

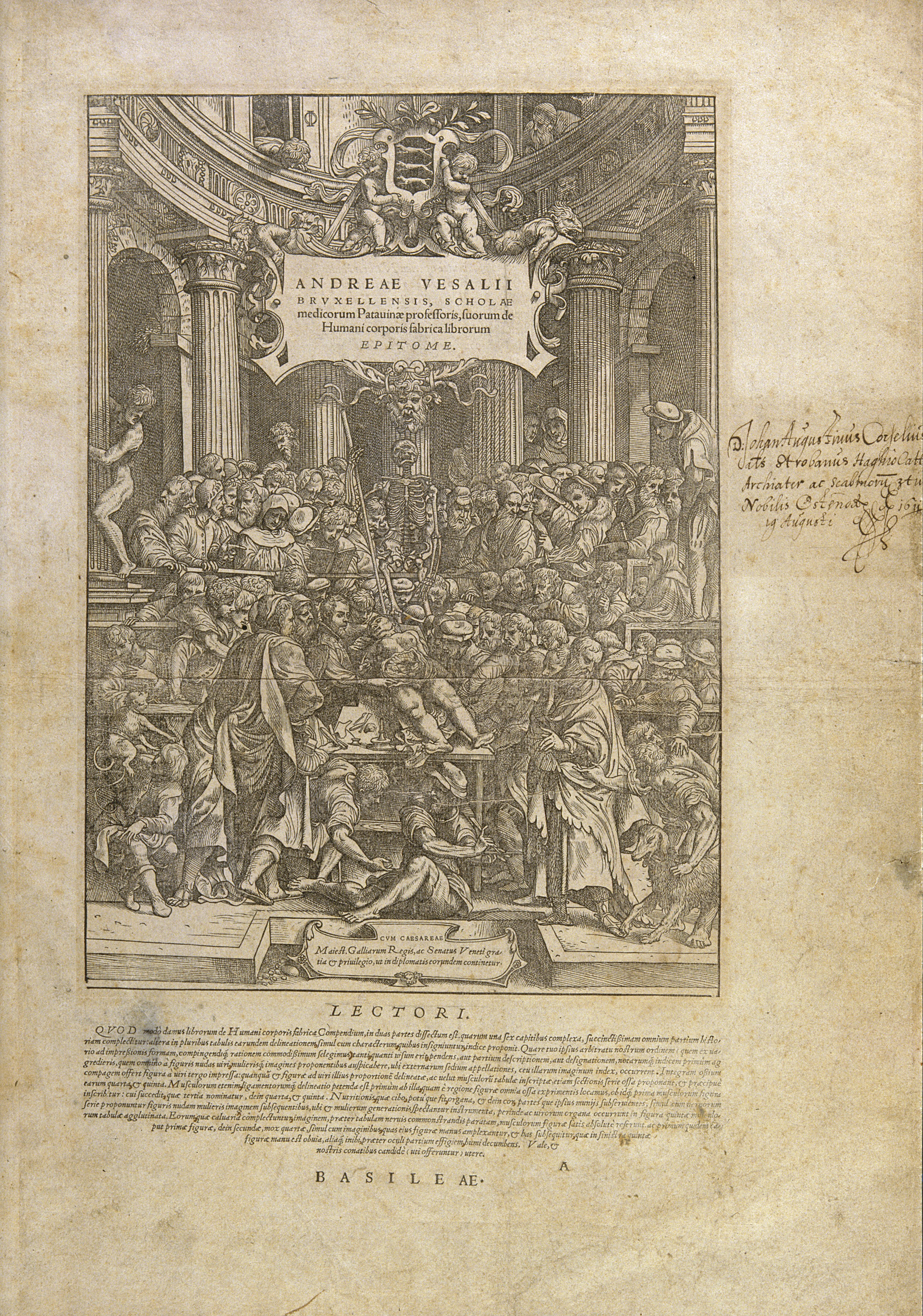
An anatomical dissection being carried out by Andreas Vesalius, 1543

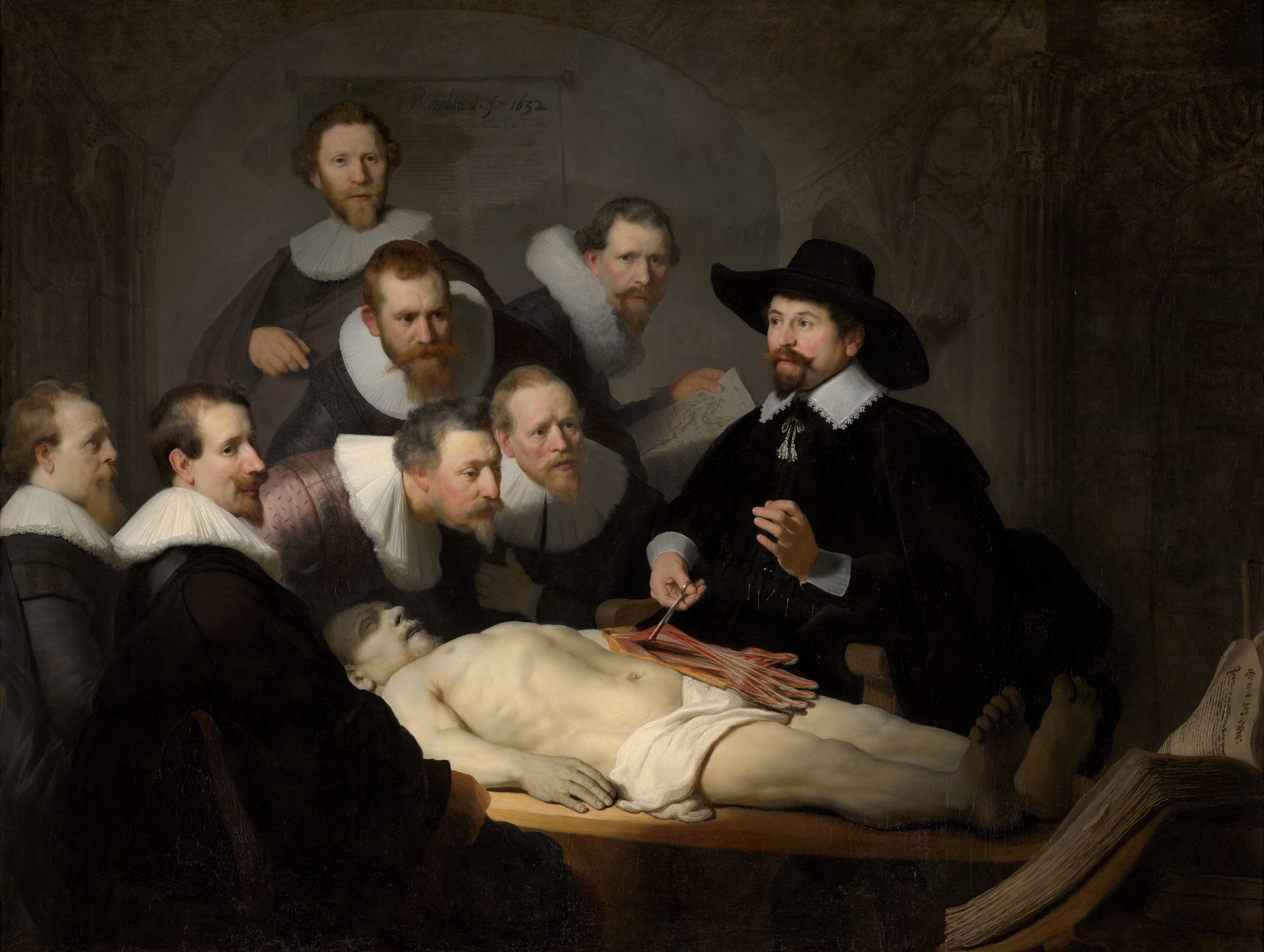
The Anatomy Lesson of Dr. Nicolaes Tulp, by Rembrandt, 1632

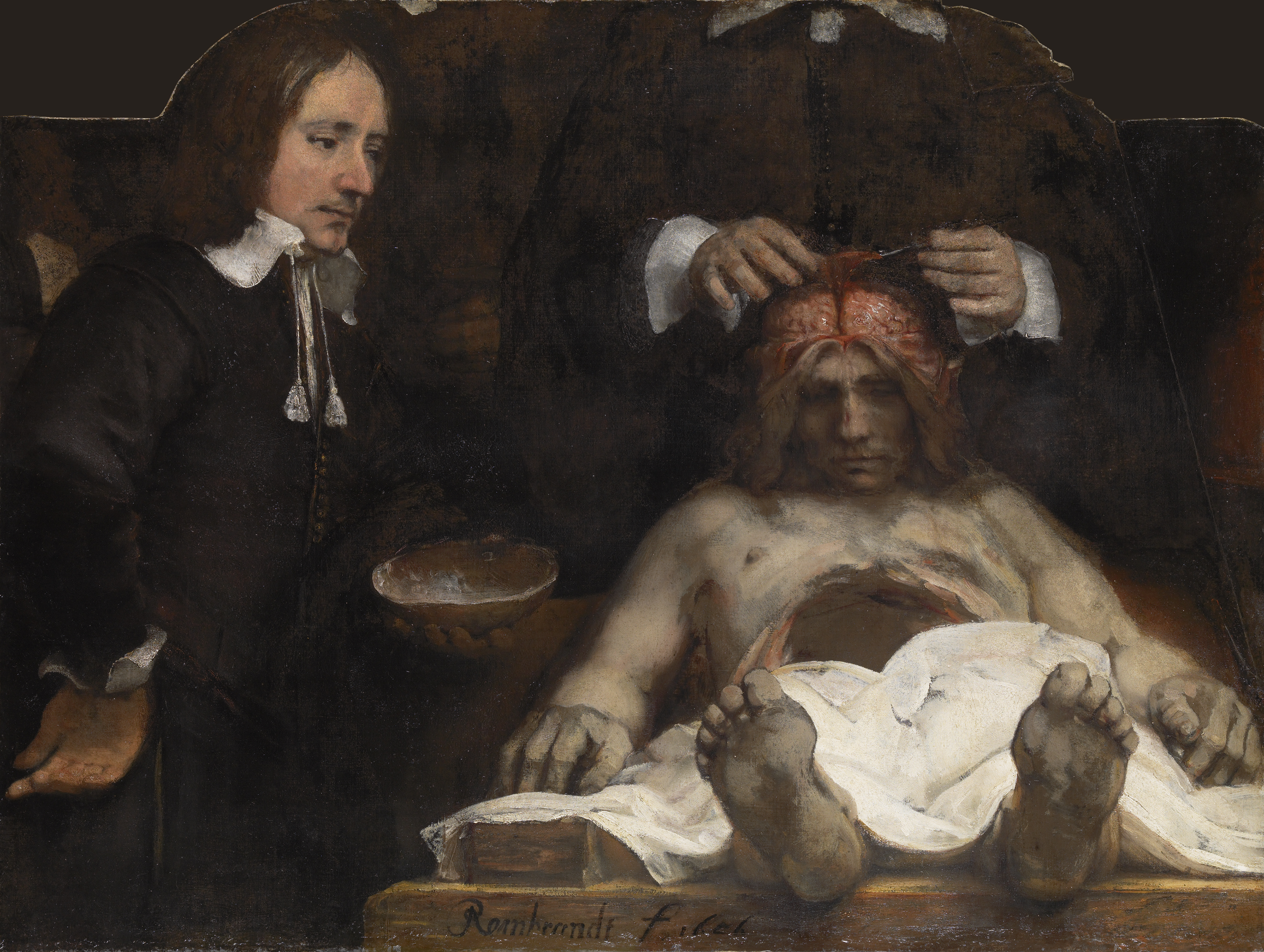
The Anatomy Lesson of Dr. Deijman by Rembrandt, 1656

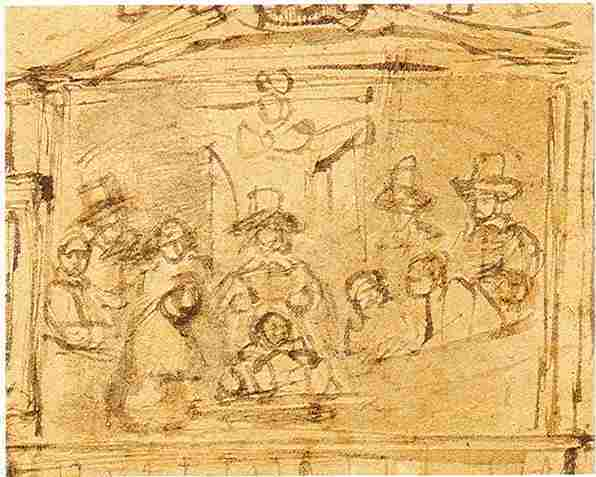
Sketch of the Preceding painting The Anatomy Lesson of Dr. Deijman

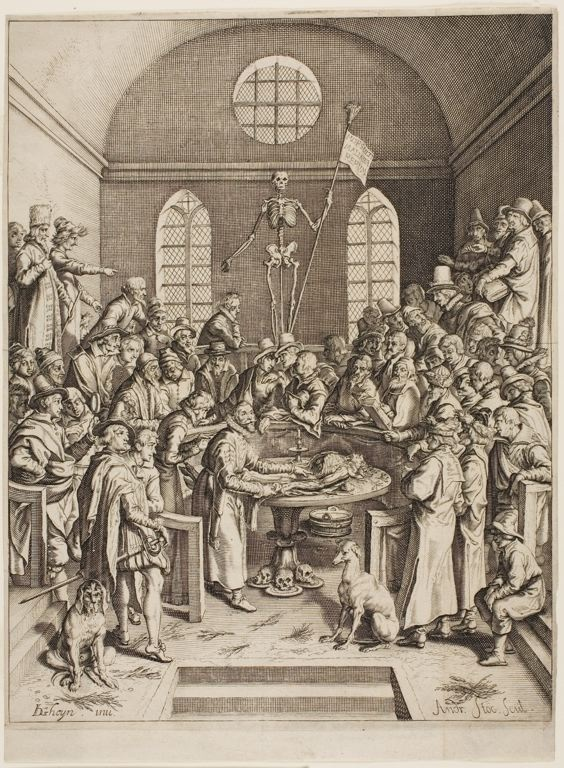
An Anatomical Theatre In Leiden, 1616

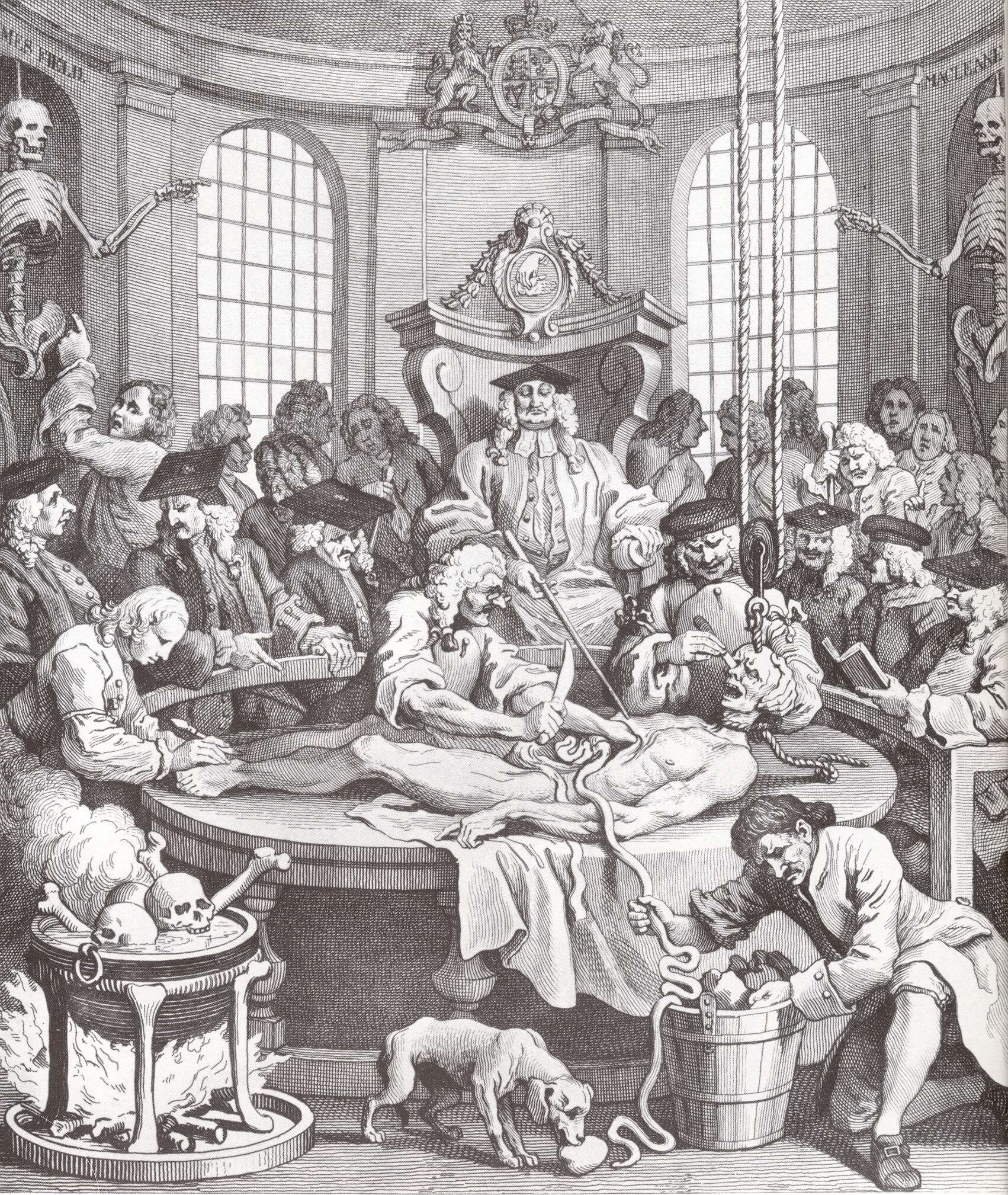
The reward of cruelty (Plate IV) by William Hogarth 1751

In the late 16th century, anatomists began exploring and pushing for contention that the study of anatomy could contribute to advancing the boundaries of natural philosophy. However, the majority of students were more interested in the practicality of anatomy, and less so in the advancement of knowledge of the subject. Students were interested in the technique of dissection rather than the philosophy of anatomy, and this was reflected in their criticism of Professors such as Girolamo Fabrici.

Anatomical theatres became a popular form for anatomical teaching in the early 16th century. The University of Padua was the first and most widely known theatre, founded in 1594. As a result, Italy became the centre for human dissection. People came from all over to watch as professors taught lectures on the human physiology and anatomy, as anyone was welcome to witness the spectacle. Participants "were fascinated by corporeal display, by the body undergoing dissection". Most professors did not do the dissections themselves. Instead, they sat in seats above the bodies while hired hands did the cutting. Students and observers would be placed around the table in a circular, stadium-like arena and listen as professors explained the various anatomical parts. As anatomy theatres gained popularity throughout the 16th century, protocols were adjusted to account for the disruptions of students. Students moved beyond simply being eager to participate, and began stealing and vandalizing cadavers. Students were thus instructed to sit quietly and were to be penalized for disrupting the dissection. Moreover, preparatory lectures were mandatory in order to introduce the "subsequent observation of anatomy". The demonstrations were structured into dissections and lectures. The dissections focused on the skill of autopsy/vivisection while the lectures would center on the philosophical questions of anatomy. This is exemplary of how anatomy was viewed not only as the study of structures but also the study of the "body as an extension of the soul". The 19th century eventually saw a move from anatomical theatres to classrooms, reducing "the number of people who could benefit from each cadaver".

=== 17th century ===
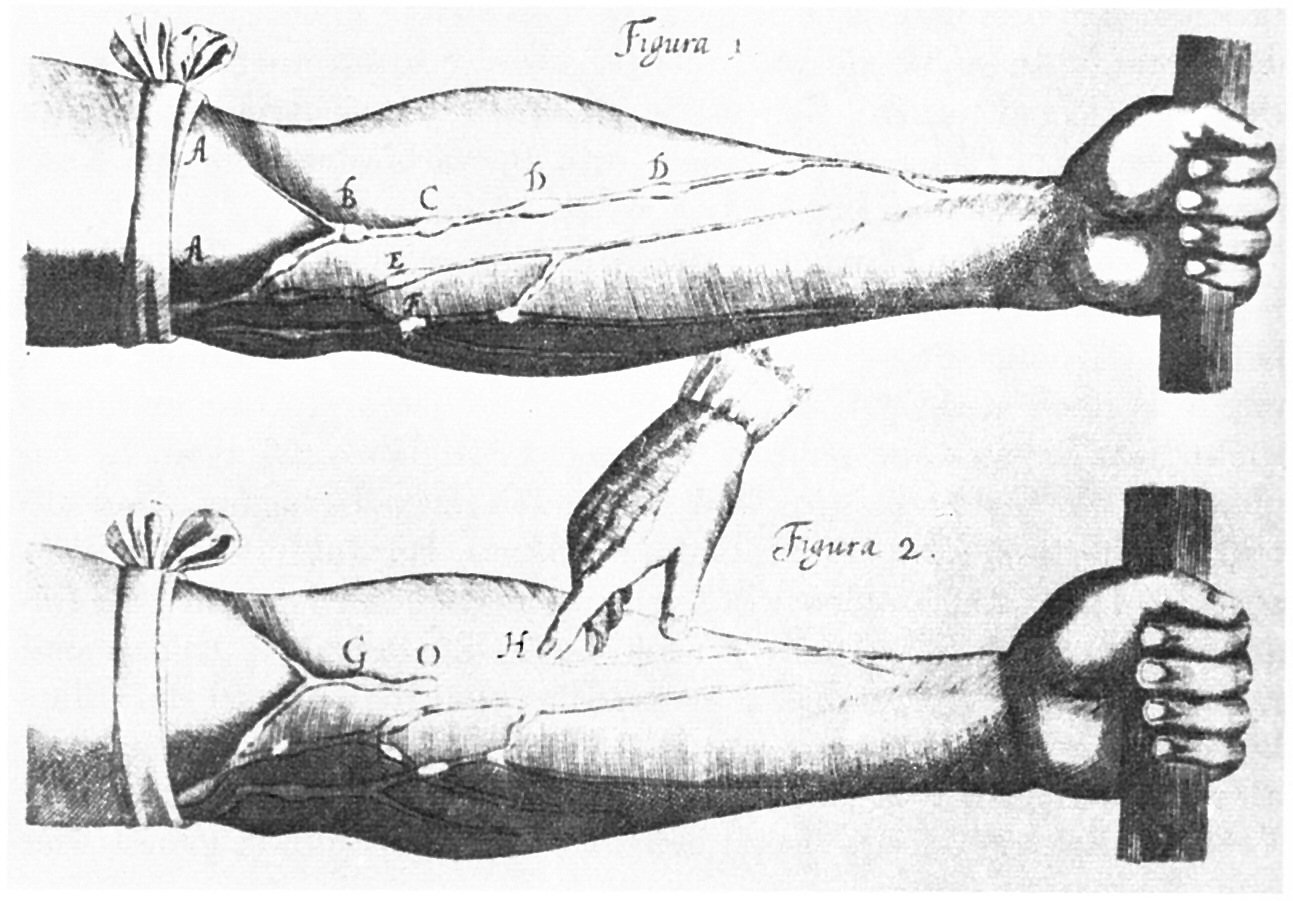
Harvey's anatomical researches from De Motu Cordis (1628)

At the beginning of the 17th century, the use of dissecting human cadavers influenced anatomy, leading to a spike in the study of anatomy. The advent of the printing press facilitated the exchange of ideas. Because the study of anatomy concerned observation and drawings, the popularity of the anatomist was equal to the quality of his drawing talents, and one need not be an expert in Latin to take part. Many famous artists studied anatomy, attended dissections, and published drawings for money, from Michelangelo to Rembrandt. For the first time, prominent universities could teach something about anatomy through drawings, rather than relying on knowledge of Latin. Contrary to popular belief, the Church neither objected to nor obstructed anatomical research.

Only certified anatomists were allowed to perform dissections, and sometimes then only yearly. These dissections were sponsored by the city councilors and often charged an admission fee, rather like a circus act for scholars. Many European cities, such as Amsterdam, London, Copenhagen, Padua, and Paris, all had Royal anatomists (or some such office) tied to local government. Indeed, Nicolaes Tulp was Mayor of Amsterdam for three terms. Though it was a risky business to perform dissections, and unpredictable depending on the availability of fresh bodies, attending dissections was legal.

The supply of printed anatomy books from Italy and France led to an increased demand for human cadavers for dissections. Since few bodies were voluntarily donated for dissection, royal charters were established which allowed prominent universities to use the bodies of hanged criminals for dissections. However, there was still a shortage of bodies that could not accommodate for the high demand of bodies.

== Modern anatomy ==
=== 18th century ===
Until the middle of the 18th century, there was a quota of ten cadavers for each the Royal College of Physicians and the Company of Barber Surgeons, the only two groups permitted to perform dissections. During the first half of the 18th century, William Cheselden challenged the Company of Barber Surgeon's exclusive rights on dissections. He was the first to hold regular anatomy lectures and demonstrations. He also wrote The Anatomy of the Humane Body, a student handbook of anatomy.

The rapid growth of medical schools in England and resulting demand for cadavers led to a shortage of bodies. In 1752, this growth led to the passage of the Murder Act, which allowed medical schools in England to legally dissect bodies of executed murderers for anatomical education and research. To further increase the supply of cadavers, the government increased the number of crimes in which hanging was a punishment. Although the number of cadavers increased, it was still not enough to meet the demand of anatomical and medical training. As a result, body-snatching and even anatomy murder were practiced to obtain cadavers. 'Body snatching' was the act of sneaking into a graveyard, digging up a corpse and using it for study. Men known as 'resurrectionists' emerged as outside parties, who would steal corpses for a living and sell the bodies to anatomy schools. The leading London anatomist John Hunter paid for a regular supply of corpses for his anatomy school. By the end of the 18th century, many European countries had passed legislation similar to the Murder Act in England to meet the demand of fresh cadavers and to reduce crime. Countries allowed institutions to use unclaimed bodies of paupers, prison inmates, and people in psychiatric and charitable hospitals for dissection. Unfortunately, the lack of bodies available for dissection and controversial perception of anatomy in the late 17th century and early 18th century caused a halt in progress that is evident by the lack of updates made to anatomical texts of the time between editions. Additionally, most of the investigations into anatomy were aimed at developing the knowledge of physiology and surgery. Naturally this meant that a close examination of the more detailed aspects of anatomy that could advance anatomical knowledge was not a priority.

Paris medicine was notorious for its influence on medical thought and its contributions to medical knowledge. The new hospital medicine in France during the late 18th century was brought about in part by the Law of 1794 which made physicians and surgeons equals in the world of medical care. The law came as a response to the increase demand for medical professionals capable of caring for the increase in injuries and diseases brought about by French Revolution. The law also supplemented schools with bodies for anatomical lessons. Ultimately this created the opportunity for the field of medicine to grow in the direction of "localism of pathological anatomy, the development of appropriate diagnostic techniques, and the numerical approach to disease and therapeutics."

The British Parliament passed the Anatomy Act 1832, which finally provided for an adequate and legitimate supply of corpses by allowing legal dissection of executed murderers. The view of anatomist at the time, however, became similar to that of an executioner. Having one's body dissected was seen as a punishment worse than death, "if you stole a pig, you were hung. If you killed a man, you were hung and then dissected." Demand grew so great that some anatomists resorted to dissecting their own family members as well as robbing bodies from their graves.

Many Europeans interested in the study of anatomy traveled to Italy, then the centre of anatomy. Only in Italy could certain important research methods be used, such as dissections on women. Realdo Colombo (also known as Realdus Columbus) and Gabriele Falloppio were pupils of Vesalius. Columbus, as Vesalius's immediate successor in Padua, and afterwards professor at Rome, distinguished himself by describing the shape and cavities of the heart, the structure of the pulmonary artery and aorta and their valves, and tracing the course of the blood from the right to the left side of the heart.

The rise in anatomy lead to various discoveries and findings. In 1628, English physician William Harvey observed circulating blood through dissections of his father's and sister's bodies. He published De moto cordis et sanguinis, a treatise in which he explained his theory. In Tuscany and Florence, Marcello Malpighi founded microscopic anatomy, and Nils Steensen studied the anatomy of lymph nodes and salivary glands. By the end of the 17th century, Gaetano Zumbo developed anatomical wax modeling techniques. Antonio Valsalva, a student of Malpighi and a professor of anatomy at University of Bologna, was one of the greatest anatomists of the time. He is known by many as the founder of anatomy and physiology of the ear. In the 18th century, Giovanni Batista Morgagni related pre-mortem symptoms with post-mortem pathological findings using pathological anatomy in his book De Sedibus. This led to the rise of morbid anatomy in France and Europe. The rise of morbid anatomy was one of the contributing factors to the shift in power between doctors and physicians, giving power to the physicians over patients. With the invention of the Stethoscope in 1816, R.T.H. Laennec was able to help bridge the gap between a symptomatic approach to medicine and disease, to one based on anatomy and physiology. His disease and treatments were based on "pathological anatomy" and because this approach to disease was rooted in anatomy instead of symptoms, the process of evaluation and treatment were also forced to evolve. From the late 18th century to the early 19th century, the work of professionals such as Morgagni, Scott Matthew Baillie, and Xavier Bichat served to demonstrate exactly how the detailed anatomical inspection of organs could lead to a more empirical means of understanding disease and health that would combine medical theory with medical practice. This "pathological anatomy" paved the way for "clinical pathology that applied the knowledge of opening up corpses and quantifying illnesses to treatments." Along with the popularity of anatomy and dissection came an increasing interest in the preservation of dissected specimens. In the 17th century, many of the anatomical specimens were dried and stored in cabinets. In the Netherlands, there were attempts to replicate Egyptian mummies by preserving soft tissue. This became known as Balsaming. In the 1660s the Dutch were also attempting to preserve organs by injecting wax to keep the organ's shape. Dyes and mercury were added to the wax to better differentiate and see various anatomical structures for academic and research anatomy. By the late 18th century, Thomas Pole published The Anatomic Instructor, which detailed how to dry and preserve specimens and soft tissue.

=== 19th century anatomy ===
During the 19th century, anatomical research was extended with histology and developmental biology of both humans and animals. Women, who were not allowed to attend medical school, could attend the anatomy theatres. From 1822 the Royal College of Surgeons forced unregulated schools to close. Medical museums provided examples in comparative anatomy, and were often used in teaching.

The history of anatomy in the United States is a rich and multifaceted narrative, closely tied to the evolution of medical education and scientific discovery. Anatomical education in the U.S. began in the mid-18th century, with notable pioneers like William Shippen Jr., who delivered public lectures on anatomy, including human dissections, in Philadelphia starting in 1762. The 19th century marked a significant expansion in anatomical education, fueled by the rapid growth of medical schools. However, this era also faced challenges, including a shortage of cadavers for dissection, which led to grave robbing and social unrest.

Reforms and innovations in anatomical education emerged during the late 19th and early 20th centuries. Influential educators such as Franklin Paine Mall at the University of Michigan introduced scientific rigor and promoted student-centered learning, setting new standards for teaching anatomy. By the 20th century, anatomy departments began evolving, often merging with disciplines like cell biology to reflect broader scientific advancements. Despite these changes, anatomy has remained a cornerstone of medical education, with modern techniques such as medical imaging and virtual dissection now complementing traditional methods of study.

== Today's anatomical research ==
Anatomical research in the past hundred years has taken advantage of technological developments and growing understanding of sciences such as evolutionary and molecular biology to create a thorough understanding of the body's organs and structures. Disciplines such as endocrinology have explained the purpose of glands that anatomists previously could not explain; medical devices such as MRI machines and CAT scanners have enabled researchers to study organs, living or dead, in unprecedented detail. Progress today in anatomy is centered in the development, evolution, and function of anatomical features, as the macroscopic aspects of human anatomy have largely been catalogued. Non-human anatomy is particularly active as researchers use techniques ranging from finite element analysis to molecular biology.

To save time, some medical schools such as Birmingham, England have adopted prosection, where a demonstrator dissects and explains to an audience, in place of dissection by students. This enables students to observe more than one body. Improvements in colour images and photography means that an anatomy text is no longer an aid to dissection but rather a central material to learn from. Plastic anatomical models are regularly used in anatomy teaching, offering a good substitute to the real thing. Use of living models for anatomy demonstration is once again becoming popular within teaching of anatomy. Surface landmarks that can be palpated on another individual provide practice for future clinical situations. It is possible to do this on oneself; in the Integrated Biology course at the University of California, Berkeley, students are encouraged to "introspect" on themselves and link what they are being taught to their own body.

In Britain, the Human Tissue Act 2004 has tightened up the availability of resources to anatomy departments. The outbreaks of bovine spongiform encephalitis (BSE) in the late 1980s and early 1990s further restricted the handling of brain tissue.

The controversy of Gunther von Hagens and public displays of dissections, preserved by plastination, may divide opinions on what is ethical or legal.

== Bibliography ==
- Knoeff, Rina (2012). Dutch Anatomy and Clinical Medicine in 17th-Century Europe. Leibniz Institute of European History.
- Mazzio, C. (1997). The Body in Parts: Discourses and Anatomies in Early Modern Europe. Routledge. ISBN 978-0-415-91694-3.
- Porter, R. (1997). The Greatest Benefit to Mankind: A Medical History of Humanity from Antiquity to the Present. Harper Collins. ISBN 978-0-00-215173-3.
- Sawday, J. (1996). The Body Emblazoned: Dissection and the Human Body in Renaissance Culture. Routledge. ISBN 978-0-415-15719-3.
