= Ancient Egyptian anatomical studies =

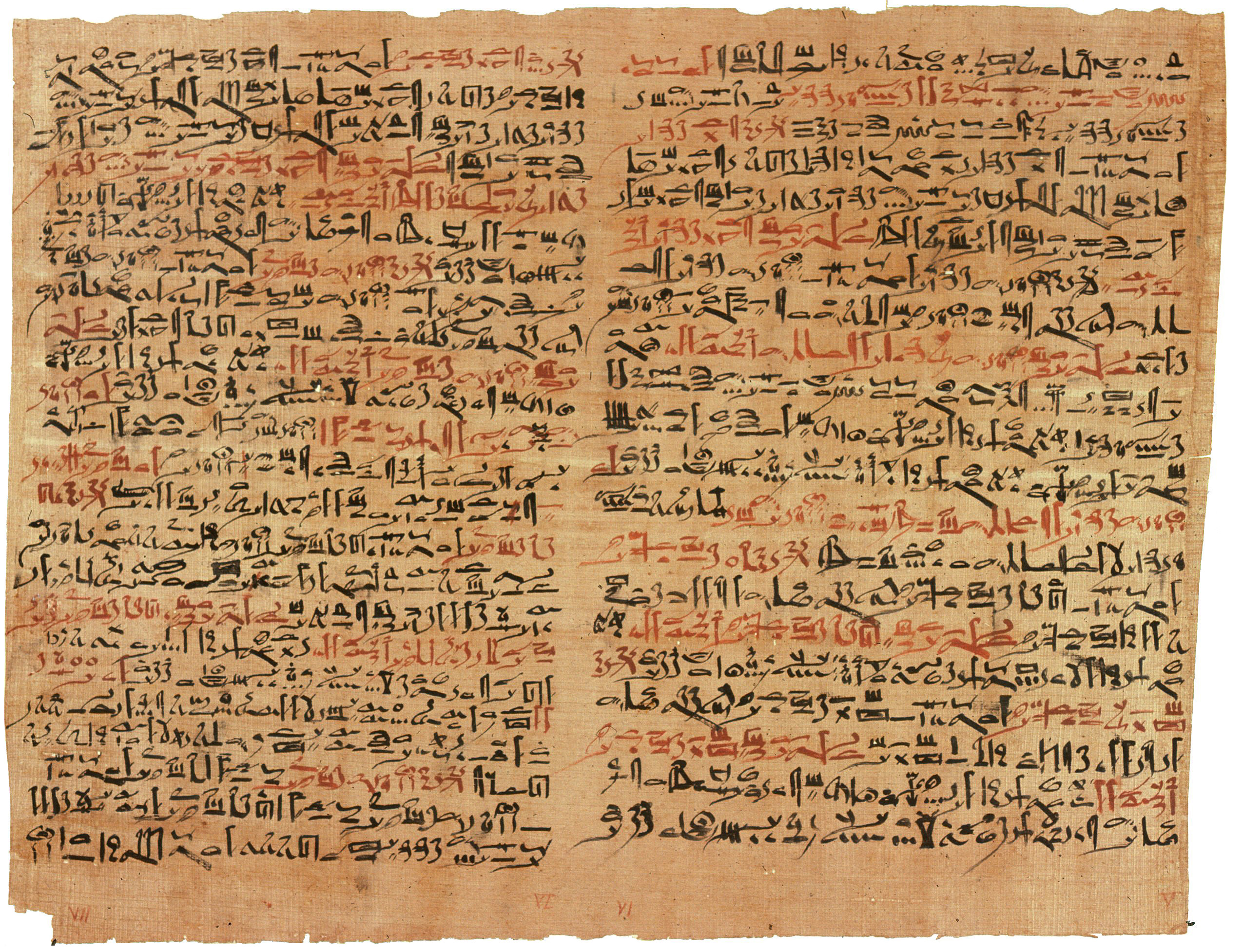
The Edwin Smith Papyrus revealed several of ancient Egyptian medical knowledge such as that on anatomy.

The Ancient Egyptian anatomical studies is an article about the history of anatomy within ancient Egypt.

== Overview ==
From a period spanning the time beginning at about 3100 B.C. to the finish of the 2nd century A.D., anatomical studies were fore-most within the ancient Egyptian nation, than within other parts of the world, according to archaeological evidence. People of the ancient Egyptian civilization initiated an independent practice of anatomical study, which represented the first movement within humanity toward the development of an understanding of anatomy; Egypt is where the study of anatomy historically first developed. People belonging to the Egyptian nation were the first to make a written record of anatomical studies.

Manetho is thought to have recorded the work of an early anatomist. In his work History of Egypt Manetho states the pharaoh Djer was an anatomist, although a source considers the likelihood of the pharaoh being an anatomist to be low. Djer is stated to have been the first to have made a written work on the study of anatomy, entitled Practical Medicine and Anatomical Book, which is known of, but not extant, although this attribution may represent an honorific observance indicating the book was written within the reign of the pharaoh, within which the book is known to have been written.

Two individuals, Herophilus, and Erasistratus, both living within Alexandria and participating within the so-called School of Alexandria, both contributed to anatomical understanding and knowledge, as they began a practice of human dissection.

Egyptian civilization was responsible for the advent of terms for external body parts, of all body parts practitioners were aware of, metu, understood to refer to the heart, was central to ancient understandings of anatomy within relevant areas of Egypt.

== Sources ==
Knowledge of anatomical studies is drawn from papyri and ostraca, especially the Ebers, Edwin Smith and Kahun Papyri. One of only two extant texts on creating a mummy is the Ritual of Embalming Papyrus. Mummification techniques led to advancement in anatomical knowledge.

=== Ebers Papyrus ===
The Ebers Papyrus describes metu, which is a word referring to vascular structures, ducts, tendons, or perhaps nerves, which run to various parts of the human head, of these there are a number amounting to fifty-two metu described within the Ebers.

=== Edwin Smith Papyrus ===
The Edwin Smith Papyrus shows the very first use of the word brain, and details information on the meninges and cerebrospinal fluid. The text describes in appreciably realistic terms, anatomical structures while detailing injuries in order of anatomy.

== See also ==
- Egyptian medical papyri
