= Aristogenes =

Aristogenes (Ancient Greek: Ἀριστογένης) is the name of more than one person of ancient history:

- Aristogenes (physician), the name of two Greek physicians mentioned by the Suda
- Aristogenes (general), one of the Greek commanders appointed to supersede Alcibiades
