= Heraclides of Smyrna =

Heracleides (Ancient Greek: Ἡρακλείδης) of Smyrna was physician, mentioned by Diogenes Laërtius as one of the followers of Hicesius, the head of the Erasistratean school of medicine at Smyrna, who must therefore probably have lived in the first century BC.
