= Chrysippus of Cnidos =

Greek physician

Chrysippus of Cnidos (Ancient Greek: Χρύσιππος ὁ Κνίδιος, 4th century BC) was a Greek physician. He was the son of Erineus, and a contemporary of Praxagoras, a pupil of Eudoxus of Cnidos and Philistion of Locri, father of Chrysippus the physician to Ptolemy Soter, and tutor to Erasistratus, Aristogenes, Medius, and Metrodorus. He accompanied his tutor Eudoxus into Egypt, but nothing more is known of the events of his life. He wrote several works, which are not now extant, and Galen says, that even in his time they were in danger of being lost. Several of his medical opinions are, however, preserved by Galen, by whom he is frequently quoted and referred to. A modern reference collection presents a fuller list of fragments.
