= Medius (physician) =

Medius (Greek: Μήδιος; 4th-3rd century BC) a Greek physician who was a pupil of Chrysippus of Cnidos, and who lived therefore probably in the 4th and 3rd centuries BC. Galen says he was held in good repute among the Greeks, and quotes him apparently as a respectable authority on an anatomical question. Like the other pupils of Chrysippus, he entirely abstained from bloodletting. He was, perhaps, the brother of Cretoxena, the mother of Erasistratus, but could not have been much older.
