= Hicesius =

Hicesius (Greek: Ἱκέσιος) was a Greek physician, who probably lived at the end of the 1st century BC, as he is quoted by Crito, and lived shortly before Strabo. He was a follower of Erasistratus, and was at the head of a celebrated medical school established at Smyrna. He is several times quoted by Athenaeus, who says that he was a friend of the physician Menodorus; and also by Pliny, who calls him "a physician of no small authority." There are two extant coins struck in his honor by the people of Smyrna.
