= Philistion of Locri =

4th-century BC Greek physician and author

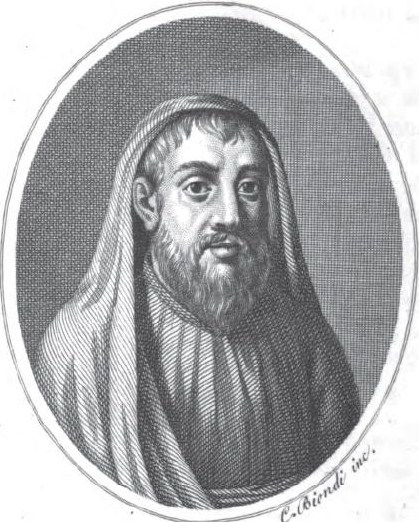
Philistion of Locri

Philistion of Locri (Greek: Φιλιστίων) was a Greek physician, medical and dietary author who lived in the 4th century BC.

He was a native of Locri in Magna Graecia, but was also referred to as "the Sicilian." He was tutor to the physician Chrysippus of Cnidos, and the astronomer and physician Eudoxus, and therefore must have lived in the 4th century BC. He was one of those who defended the opinion that what is drunk goes into the lungs. Some ancient writers attributed to Philistion the treatise De Salubri Victus Ratione, and also the De Victus Ratione, both of which form part of the Hippocratic collection. By some persons he was considered one of the founders of the Empiric school. He wrote a work on materia medica, and on Cookery, and is several times quoted by Pliny, and Galen. Oribasius attributes to him the invention of a machine for restoring dislocations of the humerus.

A brother of Philistion, who was also a physician, but whose name is not known, is quoted by Caelius Aurelianus.
