= Aristogenes (physician) =

Two Ancient Greek physicians

Aristogenes (Greek: Ἀριστογένης; fl. 3rd century BC) the name of two Greek physicians mentioned by the Suda, of whom one was a native of Thasos, and wrote several medical works, of which some of the titles are preserved. The other, according to the Suda, was a native of Cnidos and was servant to Chrysippus; but Galen says, he was his pupil, and afterwards became physician to Antigonus Gonatas, king of Macedonia. A physician of this name is quoted by Celsus, and Pliny the Elder. The two physicians mentioned may be the same person.
