= The Ritual of Embalming Papyrus =

Papyrus on mummification practices in Ancient Egypt

The Ritual of Embalming Papyrus or Papyrus of the Embalming Ritual is one of only two extant papyri which detail anything at all about the practices of mummification used within the burial practices of Ancient Egyptian culture.

One version of the papyri is held in the Egyptian Museum, Cairo (Pap. Boulaq No.3) and the other is in the Louvre (No. 5158).

== The papyri ==
The papyrus in Cairo was discovered in 1857, within a tomb in Thebes. It represents the last ten pages of a work of which all other pages are lost; of these, eight were in a good condition.

The Louvre papyrus gives the same information as is found on the last two pages of the Cairo document.

Both are copies made in hieratic script, with Demotic notation, during the Roman period, and were copied from a single earlier text.

The papyri probably date to the 1st century AD and contain specifically information on eleven acts of anointing of the body, the wrapping and placing of internal organs, which had been treated, inside canopic jars, and the act of performing the bandaging of the embalmed corpse to create a mummy.

== The ritual ==
The act of mummification described was to be done while prayers and incantations were performed ritualistically.

Persons necessarily present and participating within a performance of the ritual were a master of secrets or stolist (both refer to the same person), a lector, and a divine chancellor or seal-bearer (hetemu-netjer). Of the persons present, the individual who was the hery-sheshta fulfilled the most important and superior position, the hetemu-netjer was next in importance, then the wetiu, who were to wrap the embalmed corpse in material.

The text proceeds in the direction of the embalming the head, toward the feet.

The head was to be wrapped firstly in linen, of this first linen, the embalmer was to obtain the linen from Sais, with a second layer added afterwards.

== See also ==
- Ancient Egyptian funerary practices
