= Erasistratus =

Greek anatomist and royal physician

Erasistratus of Ceos
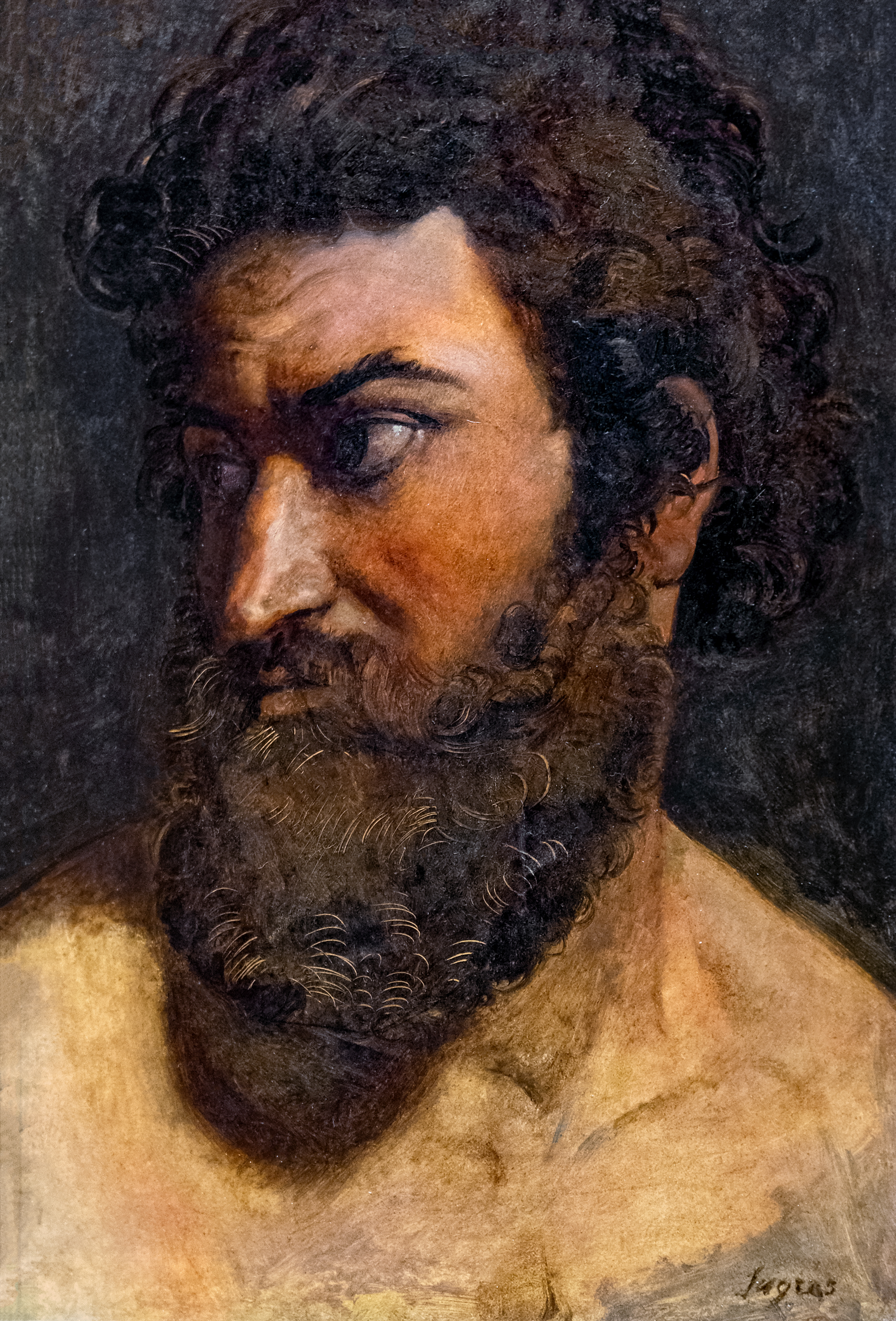
- Erasistratus by Ingres
- Born: c. 304 BC
- Died: c. 250 BC
- Occupation: Physician
- Era: Hellenistic Greece

Erasistratus (/ˌɛrəˈsɪstrətəs/; Ancient Greek: Ἐρασίστρατος; c. 304 – c. 250 BC) was a Greek anatomist and royal physician under Seleucus I Nicator of Syria. Along with fellow physician Herophilus, he founded a school of anatomy in Alexandria, where they carried out anatomical research. As well, he is credited with helping to found the methodic school of teachings of medicine in Alexandria whilst opposing traditional humoral theories of Hippocratic ideologies. Together with Herophilus, he is credited by historians as the potential founder of neuroscience due to his acknowledgements of nerves and their roles in motor control through the brain and skeletal muscles.

Furthermore, Erasistratus is seen as one of the first physicians/scientists to conduct recorded dissections and potential vivisections alongside Herophilus. The two physicians were said by several Roman authors, notably Augustine, Celsus, and Tertullian, to have performed controversial vivisections on criminals to study the anatomy and possible physiology of human organs while they were in Alexandria. Because of their research, Erasistratus and Herophilus were heavily criticized for their utilization of vivisections; specifically, by the author Tertullian who followed Christian values. Erasistratus and Herophilus are thought to be the only physicians to perform systematic dissections on the human body until the Renaissance.

Erasistratus is credited for his description of the valves of the heart, and he also concluded that the heart was not the center of sensations, but that it instead functioned as a pump, a contribution to the developing cephalocentric hypothesis which placed mind and sensation in the brain. He was among the first to distinguish between veins and arteries, believing that the arteries were full of air and that they carried the "animal spirit" (pneuma). He considered atoms to be the essential body element, and he believed they were vitalized by the pneuma that circulated through the nerves. He also thought that the nerves moved a nervous spirit from the brain. He then differentiated between the function of the sensory and motor nerves, and linked them to the brain. He is credited with one of the first in-depth descriptions of the cerebrum and cerebellum. Erasistratus is regarded by some as the founder of physiology.

== Life ==
Erasistratus is generally supposed to have been born at Ioulis on the island of Ceos, though Stephanus of Byzantium refers to him as a native of Cos; Galen, as a native of Chios; and the emperor Julian, as a native of Samos. Pliny says he was the grandson of Aristotle by his daughter Pythias, but this is not confirmed by any other ancient writer; and according to the Suda, he was the son of Cretoxena, the sister of the physician Medius, and Cleombrotus. From the latter it is not quite clear whether Cleombrotus was his father or his uncle. He was a pupil of Chrysippus of Cnidos, Metrodorus, and apparently Theophrastus.

He lived for some time at the court of Seleucus I Nicator, where he acquired great reputation by discovering the disease of Antiochus I Soter, the king's eldest son, probably 294 BC. Seleucus in his old age had lately married Stratonice, the young and beautiful daughter of Demetrius Poliorcetes, and she had already borne him one child. Antiochus fell violently in love with his stepmother, but did not disclose his passion, and chose rather to pine away in silence. The physicians were quite unable to discover the cause and nature of his disease, and Erasistratus himself was at a loss at first, till, finding nothing amiss about his body, he began to suspect that it must be his mind which was diseased, and that he might perhaps be in love. Erasistratus confirmed his conjecture when he observed that the skin of Antiochus grew hotter, his colour deeper, and his pulse quicker whenever Stratonice came near him, while none of these symptoms occurred on any other occasion. Accordingly, he told Seleucus that his son's disease was incurable, for he was in love, and that it was impossible to gratify his passion. The king wondered what the obstacle could be, and asked who the lady was. "My wife," replied Erasistratus; upon which Seleucus began to persuade him to give her up to his son. The physician asked him if he would do so himself if it were his wife that the prince was in love with. The king protested that he would most gladly; upon which Erasistratus told him that it was indeed his own wife who had inspired his passion, and that he chose rather to die than to disclose his secret. Seleucus was as good as his word, and not only gave up Stratonice, but also resigned to his son several provinces of his empire. This celebrated story is told with variations by many ancient authors, and a similar anecdote has been told of Hippocrates, Galen, Avicenna, and (if the names be not fictitious) Panacius and Acestinus. If this is the anecdote referred to by Pliny, as is probably the case, Erasistratus is said to have received one hundred talents for being the means of restoring the prince to health, which would amount to one of the largest medical fees upon record.

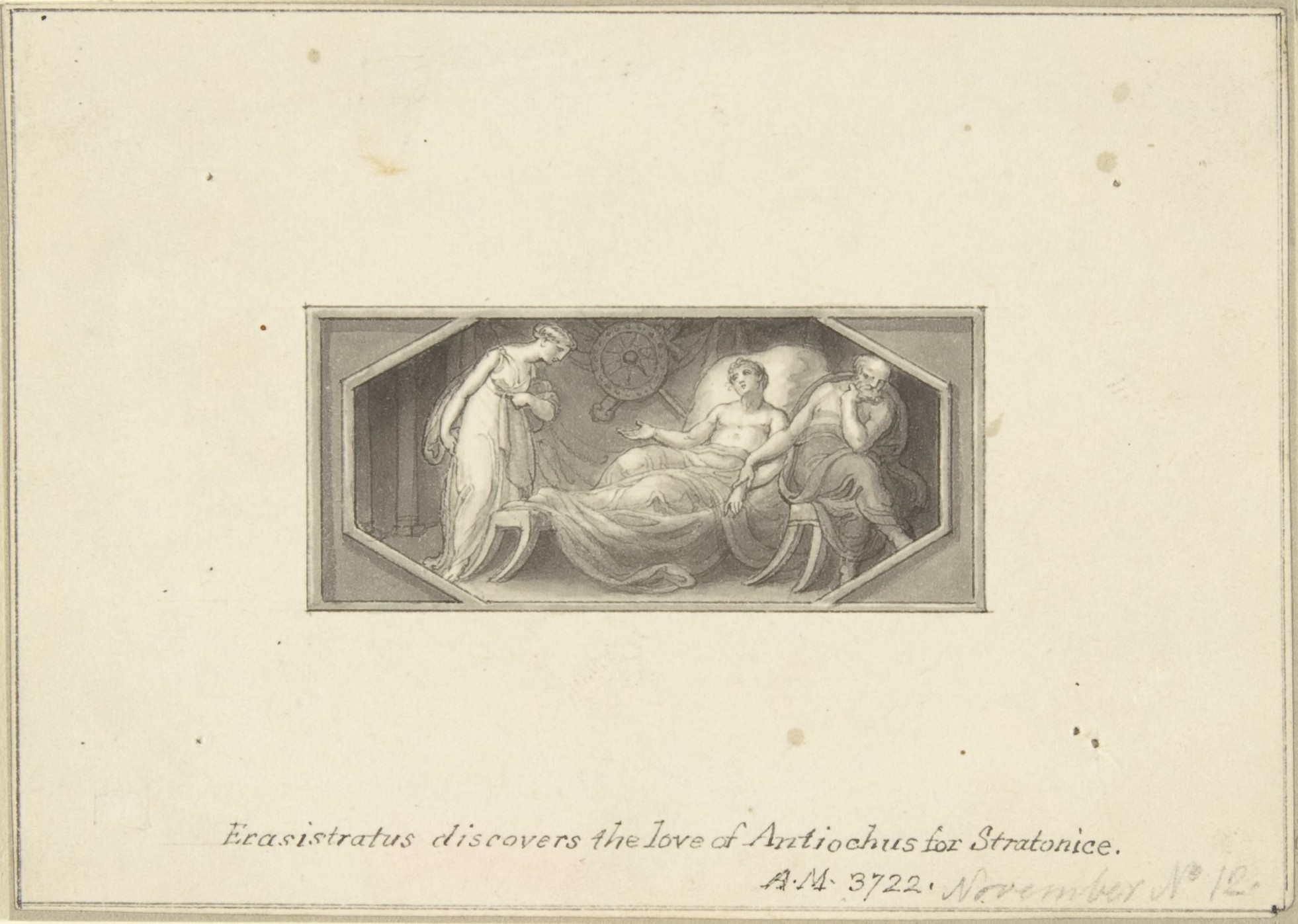
Another rendition of Antiochus's illness depicting Erasistratus's presence during the ordeal.

Very little more is known of the personal history of Erasistratus: he lived for some time at Alexandria, which was at that time beginning to be a celebrated medical school, and gave up practice in his old age, that he might pursue his anatomical studies without interruption. He and fellow physician Herophilus practiced anatomy with great success, and with such ardour that they are supposed to have dissected criminals alive. These criminals were supposedly supplied by the king at the request of Herophilus. By conducting these dissections on live subjects they were able to see the true color and shape of internal organs that were not present in deceased subjects. However, conducting these vivisections did not lead to the discovery that there was blood and not just pneuma present in the arteries, which should have been evident in dissecting a live person. Erasistratus appears to have died in Asia Minor, as the Suda mentions that he was buried by mount Mycale in Ionia. The exact date of his death is not known, but he probably lived to a good old age, as, according to Eusebius, he was alive 258 BC, about forty years after the marriage of Antiochus and Stratonice. He had numerous pupils and followers, and a medical school bearing his name continued to exist at Smyrna in Ionia nearly till the time of Strabo, about the beginning of the 1st century. The following are the names of the most celebrated physicians belonging to the sect founded by him: Apoemantes, Apollonius Memphites, Apollophanes Artemidoras, Athenion, Charidemus, Chrysippus, Heraclides of Smyrna, Hermogenes, Hicesius, Martialius, Menodorus, Ptolemaeus, Strato, Xenophon. An attack on Erasistratus and his followers is preserved in Anonymus Londinensis.

== Medicine ==
Erasistratus wrote many works on anatomy, practical medicine and pharmacy, of which only the titles remain, together with a great number of short fragments preserved by Galen, Caelius Aurelianus, and other ancient writers. These, however, are sufficient to enable us to form a reasonable idea of his opinions both as a physician and an anatomist. It is as an anatomist that he is most celebrated, and perhaps there is not one ancient physician that did more to promote that branch of medical science than he.

He appears to have been very near the discovery of the circulation of the blood, for in a passage preserved by Galen he says:

The vein arises from the part where the arteries, that are distributed to the whole body, have their origin, and penetrates to the sanguineous [or right] ventricle [of the heart]; and the artery [or pulmonary vein] arises from the part where the veins have their origin, and penetrates to the pneumatic [or left] ventricle of the heart.

The description is not very clear, but seems to show that he supposed the venous and arterial systems to be more intimately connected than was generally believed. This idea is confirmed by another passage in which he is said to have differed from the other ancient anatomists, who believed that the veins arise from the liver, the arteries arise from the heart and the heart is the origin both of the veins and the arteries. With these ideas, it can have been only his belief that the arteries contained air and not blood, that hindered his anticipating Harvey's discovery. These views also supported his belief that blood production started in the liver, and not the heart. Erasistratus had a theory that if an artery was traumatized then it would be possible however to find blood at that point, not due to blood being present within the artery itself, but rather because of the body functioning like a vacuum. When a hole would form in an artery, it would create a vacuum that would pull blood into it from a nearby vein. With his discovery of the functioning of the four main valves of the heart, he saw that when material is moved out of the heart, new material moves in, but this does not happen constantly like a water pipe. Once material has left the heart it can not come back in, and material that has entered the heart can not flow back out in the same direction. This is accomplished by membranes that open and close their mouths on the valves of the heart. However, according to Erasistratus the material moving through these valves is pneuma. The tricuspid valves of the heart are generally said to have derived their name from Erasistratus. This, however, appears to be an oversight, as Galen attributes it not to him, but to one of his followers. Erasistratus also made observations on the morphology of the heart, describing the pulmonary artery and the aorta to have a sigmoid shape, a name which is still used presently.

Erasistratus also appears to have paid particular attention to the anatomy of the brain, and in a passage from his works preserved by Galen he speaks as if he had himself dissected a human brain. Galen says that before Erasistratus had more closely examined into the origin of the nerves, he imagined that they arose from the dura mater and not from the substance of the brain; and that it was not until he was advanced in life that he satisfied himself by actual inspection that such was not the case. According to Rufus of Ephesus, he divided the nerves into those of sensation and those of motion, of which the former he considered to be hollow and to arise from the membranes of the brain and the latter from the substance of the brain itself and of the cerebellum.

He asserted that the spleen, the bile, and several other parts of the body, were entirely useless to animals. Erasistratus believed that fluids, when drunk, passed through the esophagus into the stomach. During his time, there was controversy that was carried on as to whether fluids when drunk passed through the trachea into the lungs, or through the esophagus into the stomach. He is also supposed to have been the first person who added to the word arteria, which had hitherto designated the canal leading from the mouth to the lungs, the epithet tracheia, to distinguish it from the arteries, and hence to have been the originator of the modern name trachea. He attributed the sensation of hunger to emptiness of the stomach, and said that the Scythians were accustomed to tie a belt tightly round their middle, to enable them to abstain from food for a longer time without suffering inconvenience.

The pneuma (spiritual substance) played a very important part both in his system of physiology and pathology: he supposed it to enter the lungs by the trachea, thence to pass by the pulmonary veins into the heart, and thence to be diffused throughout the whole body by means of the arteries; that the use of respiration was to fill the arteries with air; and that the pulsation of the arteries was caused by the movements of the pneuma. He accounted for diseases in the same way, and supposed that as long as the pneuma continued to fill the arteries and the blood was confined to the veins, the individual was in good health; but that when the blood from some cause or other got forced into the arteries, inflammation and fever was the consequence.

Of his method of cure the most remarkable peculiarity was his aversion to bloodletting and purgative medicines: he seems to have relied chiefly on diet and regimen, bathing, exercise, friction, and the most simple vegetables. Erasistratus was against bloodletting likely due to his theory of plethora. This was a medical term that was commonly used in Hellanistic Greece, and Erasistratus believed it was where one's body parts were full of undigested fragments of food, causing the body to then function improperly. This theory of plethora then was why many of his treatments pertained to diet, fasting, and use of drugs that would change digestion. In surgery he was celebrated for the invention of a catheter that bore his name, and which was S-shaped.

Much to the disagreement that Galen had towards Erasistratus's views regarding phlebotomy, the Alexandrian physician was said by Galen in his work entitled, Bloodletting, against the Erasistrateans at Rome, to have disregarded the importance of the practice and rather suggested alternative methods. Notably, Erasistratus suggests the bandaging of a patient's armpits and groin to achieve the desired results associated with phlebotomy. Galen continues in his work to highly criticize this viewpoint that the Alexandrian physician had regarding the medical practice, and points out that Erasistratus did not give enough evidence to support the avoidance of phlebotomy for other treatments.

== Association with Herophilus and Galen ==
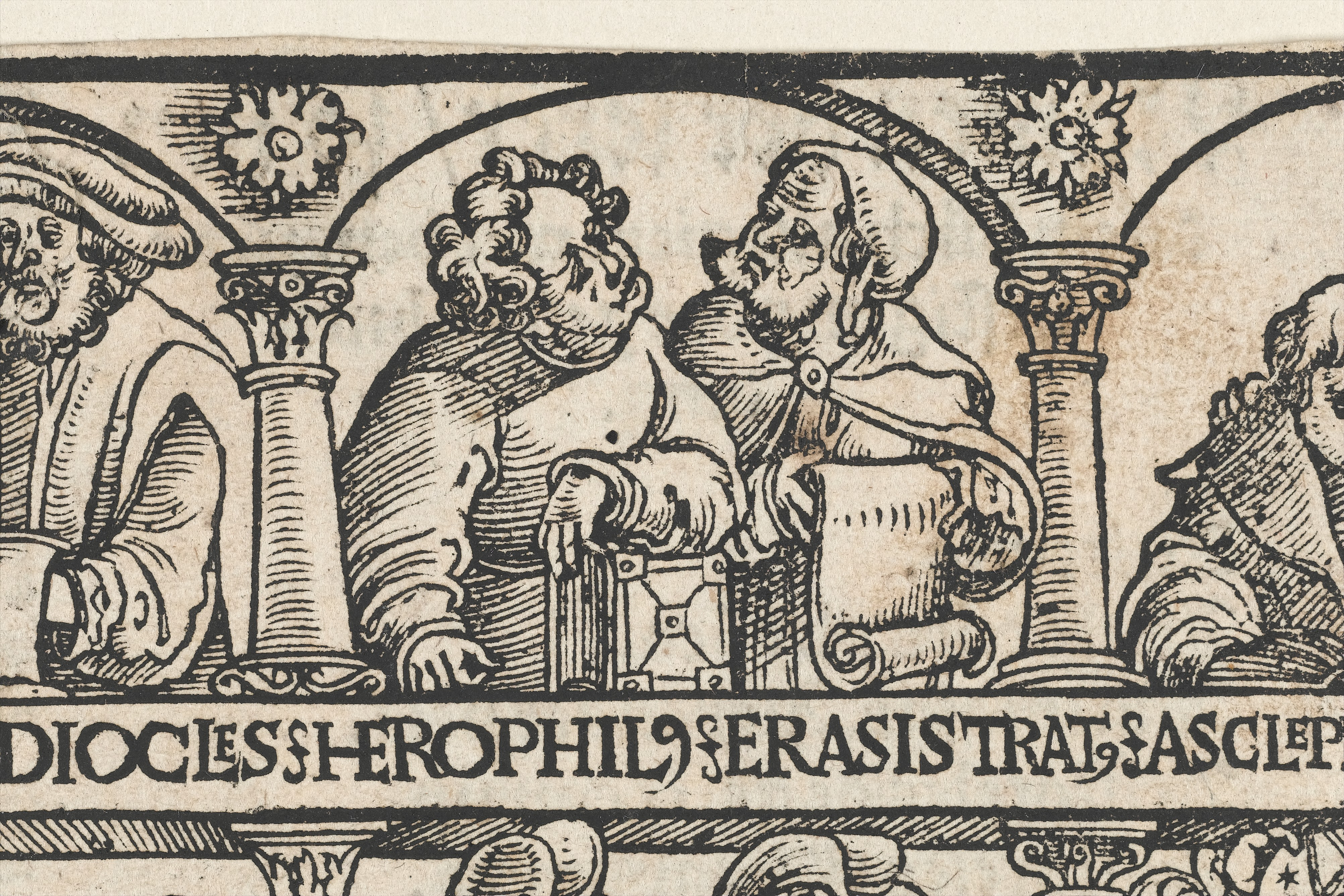
Woodcut of Herophilus and Erasistratus in the Gardens of Adonis

Erasistratus is frequently mentioned in historical documents with other significant figures of both his time period of the 3rd and 4th century BC and afterwards thanks to his accomplishments and advancements in the field of medicine. The most prominent person he is referenced with from when he was living was that of Herophilus, another physician that was an important part of ancient Alexandrian medicine with Erasistratus. Together, Erasistratus and Herophilus attributed to the revolutionary growth of knowledge in the Hellenistic period in not only science but culture as well in accordance to the writings of historians of antiquity. Although, it is noted that Erasistratus and Herophilus did not share similar ideologies in the science of medicine as well as its practice. One topic the two disagreed on what substance was actually carried by the arteries. Herophilus believed that the arteries carried a mixture of pneuma and blood, while Erasistratus believed that they solely carried pneuma. Erasistratus is said to have natural philosophical views as compared to others during the time, paving the way for the teaching of methodologists in the field of medicine. The publications of some of Galen's work, from which there are many mentions of Erasistratus and Herophilus, led to further understanding of the differing ideologies.

Erasistratus and Galen both supported the theory of pneuma, however their beliefs on how pneuma acquired the air it needed differed. Erasistratus believed that pneuma received the air it needed from the lungs. Galen agreed that air from the lungs was used for pneuma, however in expelling also as much air as was breathed in there wasn't enough air present to account for all the pneuma needed to function. Galen also believed that air was brought in through pores of the skin, and through the nose which would move to the bony cavities of the brain to be used as psychic pneuma.

Galen also noted his disagreement with Erasistratus and Herophilus on their view of the composition of organic bodies. They adopted an Aristotelian view of organic bodies consisting of three levels: elements, uniform, and non-uniform parts. Elements consisted of the elements, earth, wind, water, and fire. Uniform parts consisted of the nature of animals such as bone and flesh. Finally, non-uniform parts of nature were things such as a face or hand. Erasistratus and Herophilus believed that doctors should concern themselves with the uniform and non-uniform levels of the body, but not elements as that was the job of philosophers and scientists. This coincides with the role placed on physicians of the time to not act as scientists. Galen however, believed that to understand the human body one had to understand the mixture of its elements.

Much of what is known of Erasistratus and that of his work he did in the 3rd and 4th BC has become known through the work done by Galen. Galen frequently notes the past ideas that had become prevalent from the work of Erasistratus when comparing it to that of his work and ideas. Some historians have suggested that due to Erasistratus's disagreements with the ideologies found within Hippocratic teachings and beliefs, as well as notably phlebotomy, that Galen seems to ridicule some work that Erasistratus had synthesized. However, there are numerous times that Galen backs the ideas of Erasistratus as well, leading to opposing claims that Galen was generally negative when discussing the ideologies produced by Erasistratus.

== Downfall and loss of influence after death ==
By the time both Erasistratus and Herophilus had died, the empiricist school of medicine in Alexandria reigned as the most widely accepted ideology and method for practicing medicine for several centuries. One notable event that historians credit to downfall of Erasistratus's ideas and influence was that of the Syrian War that occurred from 246–241 BC due to its negative effect on the Alexandrian society, reducing its ability to fund programs that would continue the teachings of Erasistratus. Although, even before the Syrian War devastated the culture and economy of the Alexandrian society, Ptolemy Malefactor in 145 BC negatively impacted the continuation of Erasistratus's teachings and ideas, as well as other Alexandrian teachings, as he pushed for Alexandrian intelligentsia to be removed from the Alexandrian society completely. Ultimately, the destruction of many works, including that of Erasistratus and Herophilus, because of a fire that erupted at the great library in 391 AD may have been the greatest reason why there are limited sources of material to understand the teachings and work of Erasistratus outside that of the references to the Alexandrian physician from Galen's writings. Furthermore, it may also be the event that resulted in none of Erasistratus's original writing remaining.

== Discovery of information regarding the Alexandrian physicians ==
Much of the documentation of the works of Erasistratus and Herophilus was undiscovered until the late 20th century, so the importance of Erasistratus in the advancement of medical knowledge was not fully understood. The only substantial collection of information about their work was several fragments of their writings assembled by K.F.H. Marx and R. Fuchs from German texts. Before that, nearly the only way to learn about the work was by analyzing Galen's works, which mention Erasistratus. Similar sets of fragmented texts were also collected in English by J.F. Dobson. In the late 1980s and early 1990s, H. von Staden and Garofalo also found many important sources of information on the Alexandrian physicians.

== See also ==
- Cephalocentric hypothesis
