= Taddeo Alderotti =

13th century Italian doctor

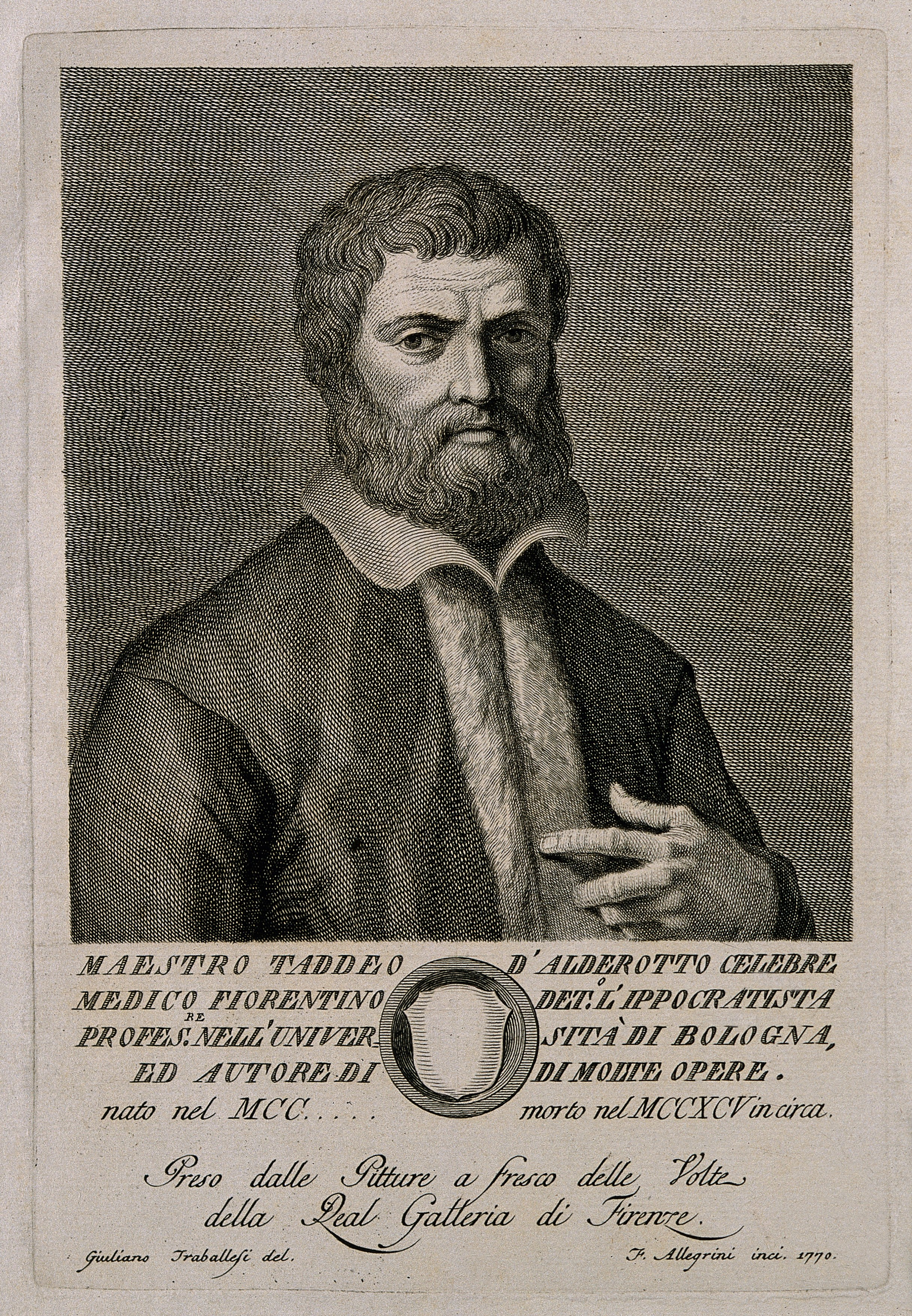
- Engraving of Alderotti by Allegrini, 1770
- Born: between 1206 and 1215; Florence, Italy
- Died: 1295; Bologna
- Occupations: Physician, Professor of Medicine

Taddeo Alderotti (Latin: Thaddaeus Alderottus, French : Thaddée de Florence), born in Florence between 1206 and 1215, died in 1295, was an Italian doctor and professor of medicine at the University of Bologna, who made important contributions to the renaissance of learned medicine in Europe during the High Middle Ages. He was among the first to organize a medical lecture at the university.

One of his works describes a method for concentrating ethanol involving repeated fractional distillation through a water-cooled still, by which an ethanol purity of 90% could be obtained.

Dante seems to reference him in Paradiso (XII, 82–85), indicating he pursued learning not for spiritual reasons but worldly ambition, contrasting him with St. Dominic.

== Life ==
Taddeo Alderotti was born in Florence, 1210, and received his primary education there.

In the mid-1260s, Alderotti went to Bologna, a city known for the study and practice of medicine. Through the middle of the fourteenth century, the universities of Bologna, Montpellier, and Paris had a virtual monopoly on medical education in Western Europe. As a professor of medicine, Alderotti quickly gained a reputation as an excellent teacher and commanded large crowds of students. His courses relied on the works of Hippocrates, Galen, and Avicenna, which had been given a position of authority since Constantine the African brought these over from north Africa in the 11th century and translated them.

The students Alderotti taught during his tenure as professor would become some of the best doctors and professors of the next generation. They included, among others, the logician Gentile da Cingoli; the doctor to the emperor, Bartolomeo da Varignana; Dino del Garbo, commentator of Avicenna; Turisanus (Pietro Torregiano de' Torregiani), commentator of Galen; and the anatomist Mondino de' Liuzzi.

A doctor of high repute, Taddeo had a large number of patients, including some far outside Bologna and residing as far away as Modena, Ferrara, Rome, and Milan. In his old age, he gave up his lectures and he moved his medical practice to Venice.

Born to a modest Florentine family, Taddeo was by the time of his death in 1295 a rich man. His last will and testament indicates that his medical practice, his lecture, and his investments had paid off handsomely.

== Works ==
- Consilia medicinalia. Modern edition, Nardi, Turin, 1937.
- In Claudii Galeni artem parvam commentarii. Naples, 1522.
- Expositiones in arduum aphorismorum Hippocratis volumen, in divinum phognosticorum Hippocratis volumen, in praeclarum regiminis acutorum Hippocratis opus, in subtilissimum Joanniti Isagorgarum libellum. Venice, 1527.
- Sulla conservazione della salute or Libello per conservare la sanitate. (On the preservation of health.) Latin edition, De conservatione sanitatis, Bologna, 1477; Italian edition, G. Manuzzi and L. Razzolini, eds., Florence, 1863.
- De virtutibus aquae vitae (apocryphal)

== See also ==
- Distillation
- Timeline of chemistry
