= Pietro da Tossignano =

Pietro da Tossignano also known as Pietro Curialti (c.1350 – 8 April 1407) was a professor of medicine in Perugia and Bologna.

He was born near Imola, and may have studied in both Bologna and Padua. At the University of Bologna, he is said to have studied under the prominent physician Tommaso del Garbo. He married young in 1372 to the wealthy daughter of the count Ruffini della Ragazza. Acquiring a diploma in 1376, he obtained a teaching position in Padua, where he won favor with the House of Carrara. But the position of professor of Medicine was granted to Jacopo Zanettini, and by 1378, Pietro had moved to teach at the University of Bologna.

By 1386, he was granted Bolognese citizenship. He was required to provide two thousand Lire as a deposit for not leaving his employment. He was admitted to the Collegio dei medici in town. However, by 1390 he had moved out of Bologna, causing the University and the City government to expel him and confiscate his properties. He moved to Ferrara, then Pavia, where he became the personal physician of Gian Galeazzo Visconti and taught at the university. In 1398, as part of a medical manuscript printed in Venice, he published a series of recommendation for the care of those afflicted by bubonic plague (Consilium pro peste evitanda). He advanced the notion that the disease was contagious and recommended isolation of the ill, fumigation of their rooms, masking by those coming in contact, and certain diets for the afflicted. He advocated the prohibition of marriages and public crowds during an epidemic.

He was acting in writing medical books including De peste, De remediis ac pestilentiae curatione, Tractatus. de pestilentia, De pydemia, Receptae.

Pietro appears to have been able to travel far afield, perhaps to Spain and Germany, to treat Henry III of Castile and Rupert of the Palatinate respectively. The latter ruler accused the physician of attempting to poison him. Pietro returns to Pavia, but soon is readmitted to Bologna, where he dies.
