= Dino del Garbo =

Italian physician and philosopher

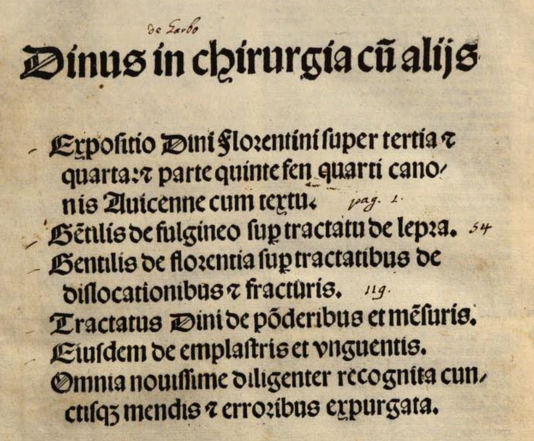

Dino di maestro B(u)ono del Garbo da Firenze (c.1280, Florence - 30 September 1327, Florence) was an Italian medieval physician and philosopher. He was also known as Dino da Firenze, Aldobrandino and in Latin as Dinus Florentinus. He studied under Taddeo Alderotti in Bologna in 1295.

== Life ==
He was the son of a physician and surgeon Bono del Garbo from the wealthy noble Del Garbo family in Florence. In 1295 he was a pupil of Taddeo Alderotti in Bologna, then one of the most important representatives of a reorientation of medicine and natural philosophy using the works of Averroes and Avicenna, to which Dino del Garbo also made a major contribution.

In 1296 he returned to his father in Florence due to the war between Bologna and Ferrara and until 1297 was enrolled alongside his father in the Florence guild of physicians and pharmacists. In 1300 the political conditions improved enough for him to resume his studies in Bologna, where he received his doctorate in the following years and taught from 1304 to 1306. When the papal legate Napoleone Orsini Frangipani excommunicated Bologna in 1306 and thus excluded the citizens of Bologna from attending the university, Dino del Garbo was once again forced to leave Bologna. Already in October 1306 he was in the municipality of Siena, on the unusually high salary of 90 gold florins as a "dotore del chomune di Siena in scienza e fisicha". He taught in Siena until spring 1309 and it was there where he completed his commentary on part of book IV of the Canon by Avicenna.

He then returned to Bologna and in 1311 began his Dilucidatorium totius pratice medicinalis scientie, a commentary on part of Book I of the Canon. After several years of teaching in Padua, in 1319 he returned to Florence and there completed his Dilucidarium. In 1321, in the wake of the Medicine and Arts Faculties' exodus from Bologna to Siena, he was re-appointed by the municipality of Siena, this time at an exorbitant annual salary of 350 gold florins. He taught in Siena until 1323 and during this time worked on his commentary on treatment using medicinal plants in book II of Avicenna's Canon, a work which he completed in 1325 after returning to Florence and which he dedicated to Robert of Anjou. He also produced a Latin commentary on Guido Cavalcanti's love poem Donna me prega, possibly during these final years in Florence - it is preserved in a manuscript of Boccaccio and was translated to an extended vernacular version.

In Giovanni Villani's chronicle (X.41) it is stated that del Garbo was involved in the persecution and execution of Cecco d'Ascoli due to earlier accusations of plagiarism, though this involvement is now questioned. Del Garbo died soon after Cecco's execution and this was later legendarily attributed to a spell of revenge cast by Cecco. His son Tommaso del Garbo was also a doctor.

== Works ==
- Dynus super quarta Fen primi : cum tabula. - Venice : Lucas Antonius Giunta Florentinus, 1522. Digitised edition from Universitäts- und Landesbibliothek Düsseldorf
- Expositio super tertia, quarta, et parte quintae fen IV. libri Avicennae. - Venice : Johann Hamann für Andreas Torresanus, 4. December 1499.Digitised edition from Universitäts- und Landesbibliothek Düsseldorf
