= Tommaso del Garbo =

Italian professor of medicine

Tommaso del Garbo or Thomas de Garbo (c.1305, in Florence – 1370, in Florence) was a professor of medicine in Perugia and Bologna. He was the son of the physician Dino del Garbo and a friend of the poet Petrarch. It is said that the physician Pietro da Tossignano studied under Garbo at the University of Bologna.

== Bibliography ==
- Consilio di Tommaso del Garbo Fiorentino contro la Pestilentia, in: M. Ficino, Contra alla peste, Firenze, 1576
