= Mondino de Luzzi =

Italian physician and anatomist (c.1270–1326)

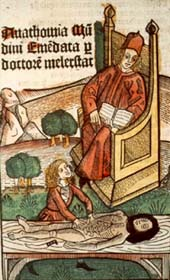
- Mondino de Luzzi, "Lesson in Anatomy", originally published in Anathomia corporis humani, 1493. Courtesy of the National Library of Medicine
- Born: ca. 1270 AD
- Died: 1326 AD
- Occupations: Anatomist, physician, professor

Mondino de Luzzi, or de Liuzzi or de Lucci, (c. 1270 – 1326), also known as Mundinus, was an Italian physician, anatomist and professor of surgery, who lived and worked in Bologna. He is often credited as the restorer of anatomy because he made seminal contributions to the field by reintroducing the practice of public dissection of human cadavers and writing the first modern anatomical text.

== Life ==
He was born around 1270 into the prominent Florentine de Luzzi family with loyalties to the Ghibellines and inscribed to the Società dei Toschi, a medieval institution of Bologna for people from Tuscany. His father, Nerino, and grandfather Albizzio were both pharmacists in Bologna, and his uncle Luzio (also Liuzzo or Lucio) was a professor of Medicine. Mondino studied at the University of Bologna in the College of Medicine and the College of Philosophy, graduated around 1290, and he was employed as a public lecturer in practical medicine and surgery at the university from 1306 to 1324. During his schooling, Mondino was a pupil of Thaddeus of Florence (Taddeo Alderotti), who made significant contributions to the development of medicine at Bologna, and a fellow student of Henri de Monteville. In addition to his achievements as an anatomist, Mondino was highly regarded as a diplomat. He was involved in city government and served as an Ambassador of Bologna to John, the son of King Robert of Naples. Mondino died in Bologna in 1326 and was buried in the parochial church of San Vitale e Agricola along with his uncle Leuzzo, who was also a lecturer in medicine. His granite tomb is adorned with a bas-relief, sculpted by Boso of Parma, which depicts an instructor seated in a large chair lecturing to students.

== Teaching methods ==
Mondino was the first to incorporate a systematic study of anatomy and dissection into a medical curriculum. The dissection of human cadavers was a hallmark of the Alexandrian school, but declined after 200 A.D. due to legal and religious proscriptions. These bans were eventually lifted, allowing Mondino to perform his first public dissection in Bologna in January 1315 in the presence of medical students and other spectators; the subject was mostly likely a female executed criminal. It was common practice for the professor of anatomy to sit in a large, ornate chair elevated above the dissection proceedings, reading from an anatomical text and providing commentary, while a demonstrator, or surgeon, physically performed the dissection. Additionally, an ostensor was present to point out the specific parts of the body that were being examined. Mondino's teaching methods were unique because he often performed dissections in person and served the role of demonstrator himself, carefully studying the cadaver and incorporating this personal experience into his text and teaching.

== Dissection theory ==
Anathomia, 1541

His dissection practices were guided by his adherence to a tripartite division of the human body. He theorized that the body was composed of three distinct containers: the skull, or superior ventricle, which enclosed the "animal members"; the thorax, or middle ventricle, which contained "spiritual members" such as the heart and lungs; and finally the abdomen, or inferior ventricle, which housed "natural members" including the liver and other visceral organs. Mondino utilized the differences between animal, spiritual, and natural members to classify distinct aspects of physiological activity. He also asserted that certain parts of the body are innately superior to others; according to that hierarchical arrangement, the abdomen should be dissected first because its organs are "the most confused and least noble", followed by the thorax, and finally the head, which contains "higher and better organized" anatomical structures. Additionally, Mondino argued that distinct dissection methods should be applied to simple structures (such as bones, muscles, nerves, veins, and arteries) as compared to more complex composite parts (for example, the eye, ear, liver, and spleen. He also suggested that when to study the muscles of the limbs, a sun-dried body be used as an alternative to the more laborious practice of dissecting a rapidly-decaying cadaver.

== Contributions to anatomy ==
Mondino's major work, Anathomia corporis humani, written in 1316, is considered the first example of a modern dissection manual and the first true anatomical text. The earliest edition of the work was printed in Padua between 1475 and 1478, and more than 40 editions are thought to exist. By the 14th century, the practice of anatomy had come to involve the dissection of a cadaver according to prescribed rules; Anathomia was intended as a handbook to guide this process. Anathomia remained the most widely used anatomical text for 250 years (through the 16th century) because it clearly and concisely provided the important technical indications involved in the dissection process, including the steps involved and the reasoning behind the organization of these procedures. Unlike his predecessors, Mondino focuses specifically on anatomical descriptions rather than engaging in a larger discourse on pathology and surgery in general.

Anathomia opens with the assertion that human beings are superior to all other creatures because of their intellect, reasoning ability, tool-making abilities, and upright stature; because he possesses these noble qualities, man is worthy to be studied. Mondino goes on to describe the organs in the order in which they present themselves during the dissection process. Dissection began with the opening of the abdominal cavity via vertical incision running from the stomach to the pectoral muscles and a horizontal cut above the navel. First, the musculature of the intestinal tract is described in detail, followed by an extensive discussion of the form, function, and position of the stomach. According to the text, the stomach is spherical; the stomach wall has an internal lining, which is "the seat of sensation", and an external fleshy coat that is involved in digestion. In order to access the spleen, which was thought to secrete black bile into the stomach through imaginary canals, the dissector was required to remove the "false ribs". The liver is said to have five lobes, the gallbladder is described as the seat of yellow bile, and the cecum is described with no mention of the vermiform appendix. Though Anathomia only vaguely describes the pancreas, the pancreatic duct is discussed in greater detail. He also makes new observations regarding the anatomy of the bladder and the enlargement of the uterus during both menstruation and pregnancy.

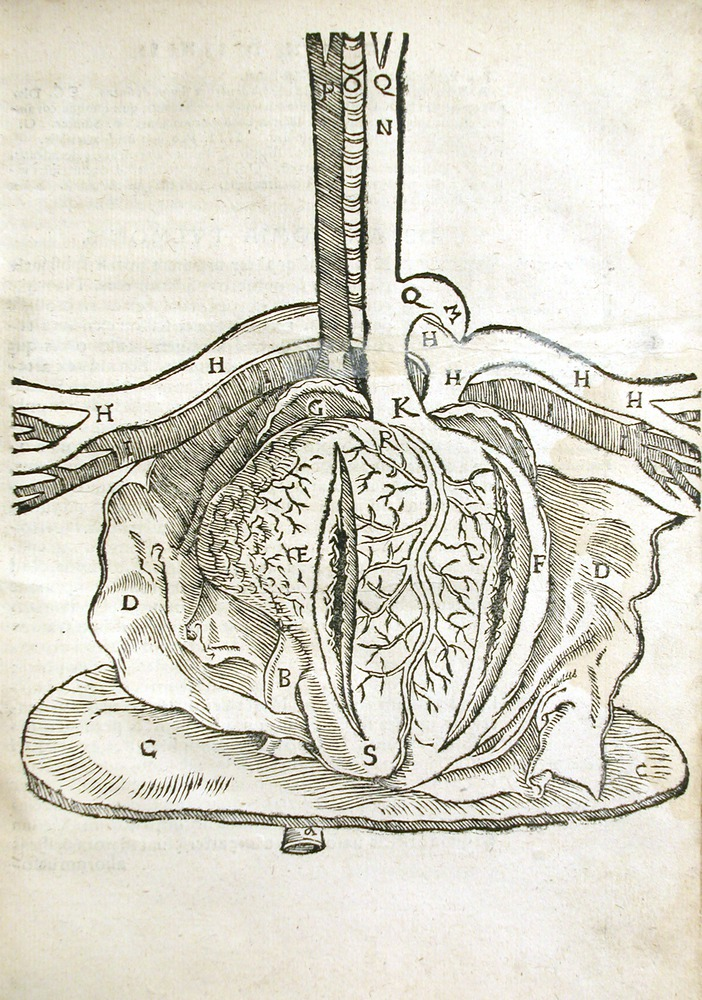
Dissection of Heart, from Mondino Dei Luzzi's Anatomia Mundini, Ad Vetustis, 1541

Mondino's description of the human heart, though inaccurate, is fairly detailed. He discusses three chambers: the right ventricle, the left ventricle, and a middle ventricle within the septum. The right ventricle is purported to contain a large opening, through which the heart draws blood originating in the liver, as well as the opening of the vena arterialis toward the lung. The left ventricle contains an orifice with three valves and the bivalvular opening of the arteria venalis, which allows the passage of a smoke-like vapor from the lungs. Despite these anatomical shortcomings, the vena chili (Mondino's name for the vena cava) is noteworthy in its accuracy. He then moves on to the lungs, describing the course of the vena arterialis (pulmonary artery) and the arteria venalis (pulmonary vein). This section of Anathomia also describes the pleura and notes the importance of distinguishing between pulmonary pathologies including true pleurisy, false pleurisy, and pneumonia. His descriptions of the larynx and epiglottis are very rudimentary.

Mondino describes the closure of an incised intestinal wound by having large ants bite on its edges and then cutting off their heads, which one scholar interprets as an anticipation of the use of staples in surgery. Anathomia also includes a detailed passage on the surgical treatment of a hernia, both with and without castration, as well as a description of a type of cataract surgery.

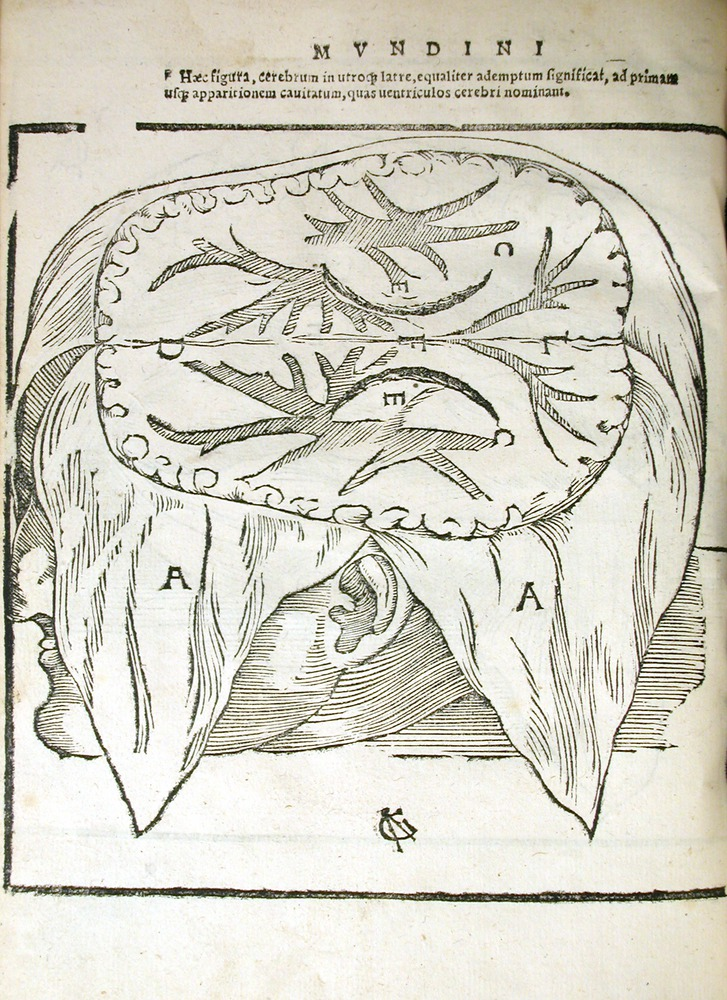
Section of Brain in dissected Skull, from Mondino Dei Luzzi's Anatomia Mundini, Ad Vetustis, 1541

Mondino's treatment of the skull provides only inexact directions for its dissection, suggesting that the cranial cavity was opened infrequently and with little technical skill. Nonetheless, Anathomia contains a description of the cranial nerves derived from Galen's Uses of the parts of the body of man. Furthermore, the brain is divided into three vesicles, with the anterior vesicle serving as the meeting place of the senses, the middle vesicle housing the imagination, and the posterior vesicle containing the memory. Movement of the choroid plexus is said to control mental processes by opening and closing passages between the ventricles. Mondino follows Galen and the Islamic commentators in placing the lens in the center of the eye.

Much of the medical information included in Anathomia is derived from commentaries on Hippocrates, Aristotle, and Galen written by Islamic scholars. Although Mondino makes frequent references to his personal dissection experiences, he nonetheless repeats numerous fallacies reported by these textual authorities. For example, he propagates the incorrect Galenic notion that a rete mirabile ("miraculous network") of blood vessels exists at the base of the human brain when it is in fact present only in ungulates. Other errors contained in Anathomia are the result of an attempt to reconcile the teachings of Galen and Aristotle. This is exemplified by Mondino's description of the heart: he combines Aristotle's notion of a triventricular heart with Galen's claim that a portion of the blood can flow directly from one side of the heart to the other though a permeable interventricular septum. He also propagates information about the human reproductive system that is not corroborated by anatomical evidence, including the existence of a seven-celled uterus with hornlike appendages.

== Legacy ==
He made lasting, even if not entirely accurate, contributions to the fields of anatomy and physiology. Anathomia quickly became a classic text and, after his death, Mondino was regarded as a "divine master" to such an extent that anything differing from the descriptions in his book was regarded as anomalous or even monstrous. For three centuries, the statutes of many medical schools required lecturers on anatomy to use Anathomia as their textbook. Jacopo Berengario da Carpi, a 16th-century professor of anatomy at Bologna, wrote an extensive commentary on Mondino's work, and the text of Anathomia was incorporated into Ketham's 1493 text Fasciculus medicinae.
