= Turisanus =

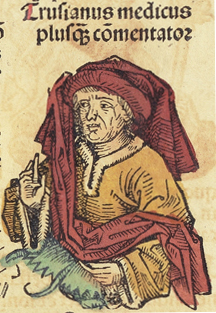
Generic portrait of "Trusianus medicus plusq[a]m com[m]entator", woodcut from the Nuremberg Chronicle

Turisanus de Turisanis was the Latin name of Pietro Torrigiano de' Torrigiani (died c. 1320), a theoretical physician from a well-known Florentine family who taught medicine in Paris, c. 1305–19, and wrote an elaborated and influential series of commentaries on Galen's Microtechni, Plusquam commentum in Microtechni Galenii and a shorter De hypostasi urine Galeni. The two commentaries, all that survives of Torrigiani's output, were printed together by Ugo Rugerius in 1489, and in several later editions, both incunabula and 16th-century printings. The work took the conventional form of the set of quaestiones disputatae familiar in Scholasticism.

He was trained in the famed medical school of Bologna as a pupil of the Florentine Taddeo Alderotti (Thaddeus Florentinus). In his old age he retired to a Carthusian monastery, thus he is referred to a Monachus.

He was the first medieval physician to propose an original theory about blood and its role in the human system.
