= Molecular anatomy =

Molecular anatomy is the subspecialty of microscopic anatomy concerned with the identification and description of molecular structures of cells, tissues, and organs in an organism.
