= Facies (medical) =

Distinctive facial appearance associated with a medical condition

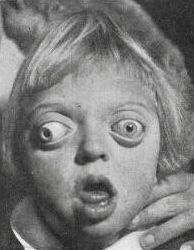
- Facial abnormalities associated with Crouzon syndrome
- Specialty: Medical genetics

In medical contexts, a facies is a distinctive facial expression or appearance associated with a specific medical condition. The term comes from Latin for "face". As a fifth declension noun, facies can be both singular and plural.

== Types ==
Examples include:

- Hippocratic facies – eyes are sunken, temples collapsed, nose is pinched with crusts on the lips, and the forehead is clammy
- Moon face (also known as "Cushingoid facies") – Cushing's syndrome
- Elfin facies – Williams syndrome, Donohue syndrome
- Potter facies – oligohydramnios
- Mask like facies – parkinsonism
- Leonine facies – lepromatous leprosy or craniometaphyseal dysplasia
- Mitral facies – mitral stenosis
- Amiodarone facies (deep blue discoloration around malar area and nose)
- Acromegalic facies – acromegaly
- Flat facies – Down syndrome, Stickler syndrome, Binder syndrome
- Marfanoid facies – Marfan's syndrome
- Snarling facies – myasthenia gravis
- Myotonic facies – myotonic dystrophy
- Torpid facies – myxoedema
- Mouse facies – chronic kidney failure
- Plethoric facies – Cushing's syndrome and polycythemia vera
- Bird facies – Pierre Robin sequence, Seckel syndrome, LIG4 syndrome
- Ashen grey facies – myocardial infarction
- Gargoyle facies – Hurler's syndrome
- Monkey facies – marasmus
- Hatchet facies – myotonia atrophica
- Gorilla-like face – acromegaly
- Bovine facies (or cow face) – craniofacial dysostosis or Crouzon syndrome
- Marshall halls facies – hydrocephalus
- Frog face – intranasal disease, anencephaly
- Coarse facies – many inborn errors of metabolism
- Adenoid facies – developmental facial traits caused by adenoid hypertrophy, nasal airway obstruction and mouthbreathing; really a form of long face syndrome.
- Lion-like facies – involvement of craniofacial bones in Paget disease of Bone
- Chipmunk facies – beta thalassemia
- Treacher Collins syndrome – deformities of the ears, eyes, cheekbones, and chin

== Other disorders associated with syndromic facies ==
- Pitt–Hopkins syndrome
- Beta thalassemia is associated with distinctive facial features due to ineffective erythropoiesis. The ineffective erythropoiesis causes marrow hyperplasia or expansion and bony changes, including the bones of the face; this causes craniofacial protrusions.
- Mowat–Wilson syndrome
- Rubinstein–Taybi syndrome
- Snijders Blok–Campeau syndrome

== See also ==
- Body habitus
