= Snijders Blok–Campeau syndrome =

- Other names: SNIBCPS, IDDMSF
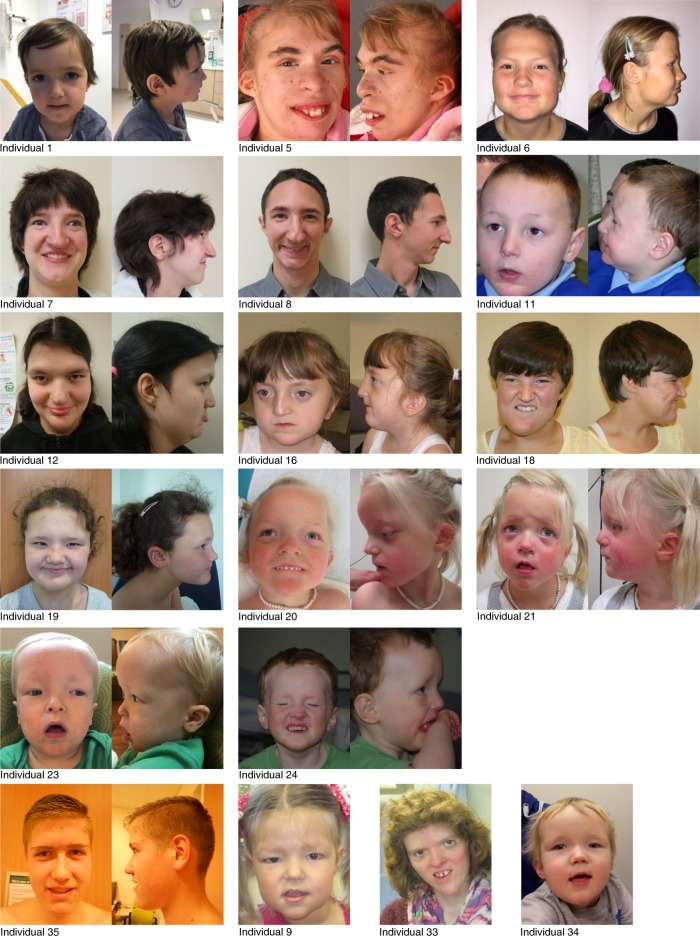
- An image displaying 18 individuals who have Snijders Blok–Campeau syndrome
- Symptoms: Intellectual disability, Macrocephaly, distinctive facial features
- Usual onset: Before birth
- Duration: Life long
- Causes: Mutations in the CHD3 gene
- Frequency: Approximately 60 cases described in scientific literature, with an estimated 237 diagnosed worldwide

Snijders Blok–Campeau syndrome is a rare autosomal genetic disorder caused by mutations in the CHD3 gene. It is characterized by impaired intellectual development, macrocephaly, dysarthria and apraxia of speech, and certain distinctive facial features.

Snijders Blok–Campeau syndrome is typically a de novo mutation which generally occurs during the early embryonic stages of development or during the formation of the parent's reproductive cells. This allows for prenatal diagnosis.

== Signs and symptoms ==
Snijders Blok–Campeau syndrome almost always comes with both physical and intellectual disabilities. Those with the condition will typically have trouble in the development of speech and language. Around one half typically have some form of macrocephaly, while around one third show signs of autism or similar conditions.

| Characteristics | Percentage | Characteristics | Percentage |
|---|---|---|---|
| Developmental disorder | 100% | Flexible ligaments | 40% |
| Speech delay or disorder | 100% | Central nervous system abnormalities | 39% |
| Intellectual disability | 95% | Male genital abnormalities | 35% |
| Low muscle tone | 92% | Autism or autism-like features | 33% |
| Large or prominent forehead | 85% | Neonatal feeding problems | 31% |
| Widely spaced eyes | 77% | Strabismus | 30% |
| Visual abnormalities | 75% | Seizures | 21% |
| Thin upper lip | 74% | Congenital heart disease | 21% |
| Broad nasal bridge | 71% | Missing teeth | 16% |
| Macrocephaly | 58% | Hearing loss | 13% |
| Deep set eyes | 54% | Microcephaly | 5% |

== Cause ==
The CHD3 gene is required for chromatin remodeling, a process that regulates gene expression. By allowing for the creation of chromatin, the CHD3 gene affects how tightly DNA is packed into chromosomes. A mutation of the CHD3 gene changes the amount of chromatin produced, causing over or underexpression of other genes.

== History ==
Due to the rarity of the condition, with only approximately 60 cases documented in scientific literature, Snijders Blok–Campeau syndrome was only discovered in 2018 by clinical geneticist Lot Snijders Blok and clinician-scientist Philippe M Campeau. The mutation was first documented in the paper "CHD3 helicase domain mutations cause a neurodevelopmental syndrome with macrocephaly and impaired speech and language".

== Treatment ==
There is no available cure for the syndrome, and treatment is supportive.

In 2026, successful trials of gene therapy in mice and monkeys were reported by Zilong Qiu and his team at the Shanghai Jiao Tong University School of Medicine, in the journal Nature. It was subsequently discovered that a year before, Qiu had treated a six-year-old girl at Xinhua Hospital in Shanghai using engineered viruses to carry the corrected gene into the spinal fluid. The girl died of thrombotic microangiopathy several days later.
