= Insulin receptor =

Cell receptor found in humans

INSR
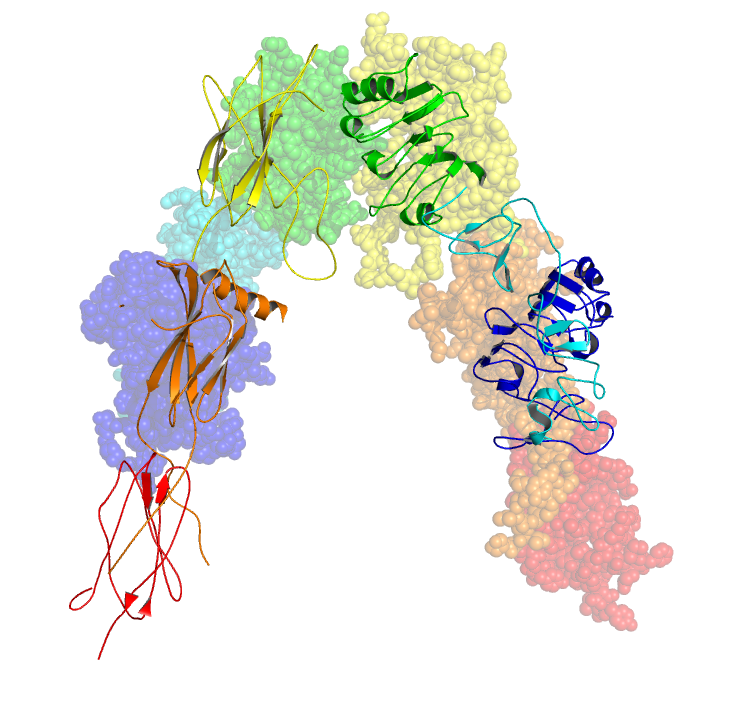

Identifiers
- Aliases: INSR, CD220, HHF5, insulin receptor
- External IDs: OMIM: 147670; MGI: 96575; GeneCards: INSR
Available structures
PDB	Ortholog search: PDBe RCSB
PDB	List of PDB id codes 1GAG, 1I44, 1IR3, 1IRK, 1P14, 1RQQ, 2AUH, 2B4S, 2HR7, 3BU3, 3BU5, 3BU6, 3EKK, 3EKN, 3ETA, 3W11, 3W12, 3W13, 3W14, 2MFR, 2Z8C, 4IBM, 4OGA, 4XLV, 4XST, 5E1S, 4ZXB, 5J3H, 5HHW
Enzyme activity
EC #	BRENDA	ExPASy	KEGG	MetaCyc
2.7.10.1	↗	↗	↗	↗

Gene location (Human)
Chr.	Chromosome 19 (human)
Band	19p13.2	Start	7,112,255 bp
Band	19p13.2	End	7,294,414 bp

Gene location (Mouse)
Chr.	Chromosome 8 (mouse)
Band	8 A1.1|8 1.82 cM	Start	3,172,061 bp
Band	8 A1.1|8 1.82 cM	End	3,329,617 bp
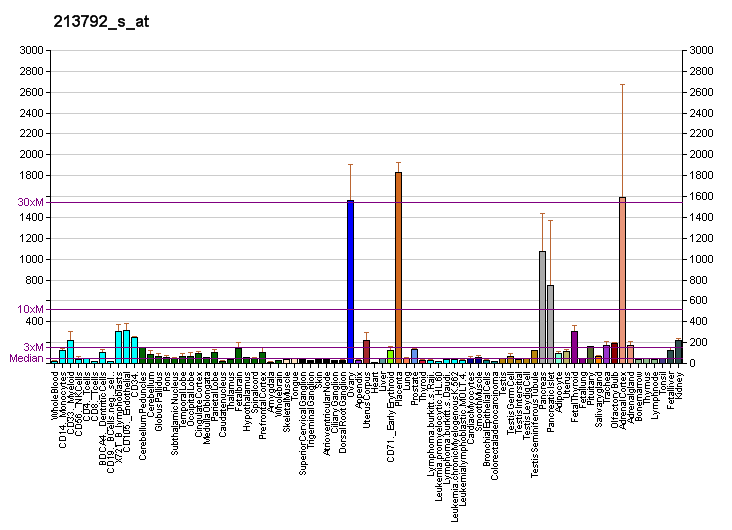
RNA expression pattern
Bgee	Human / Mouse (ortholog); Top expressed in: buccal mucosa cell; palpebral conjunctiva; visceral pleura; middle temporal gyrus; kidney tubule; renal medulla; tibia; seminal vesicula; epithelium of nasopharynx; body of pancreas / Top expressed in: retinal pigment epithelium; Paneth cell; ciliary body; lacrimal gland; left lobe of liver; parotid gland; substantia nigra; digastric muscle; triceps brachii muscle; sternocleidomastoid muscle; More reference expression data
BioGPS	More reference expression data
Gene ontology
Molecular function	kinase activity; insulin-like growth factor II binding; transmembrane receptor protein tyrosine kinase activity; ATP binding; protein kinase activity; insulin-like growth factor receptor binding; insulin receptor substrate binding; transferase activity; protein binding; protein tyrosine kinase activity; nucleotide binding; insulin-like growth factor I binding; GTP binding; PTB domain binding; phosphatidylinositol 3-kinase binding; insulin binding; insulin-activated receptor activity; protein domain specific binding; amyloid-beta binding; cargo receptor activity; protein-containing complex binding
Cellular component	membrane; caveola; insulin receptor complex; extracellular exosome; integral component of membrane; receptor complex; plasma membrane; endosome membrane; integral component of plasma membrane; intracellular anatomical structure; nuclear envelope; external side of plasma membrane; axon; nuclear lumen; dendrite membrane; neuronal cell body membrane
Biological process	positive regulation of glucose import; insulin receptor signaling pathway; positive regulation of protein phosphorylation; regulation of embryonic development; positive regulation of developmental growth; protein phosphorylation; regulation of female gonad development; animal organ morphogenesis; transformation of host cell by virus; positive regulation of mitotic nuclear division; positive regulation of meiotic cell cycle; positive regulation of protein kinase B signaling; positive regulation of glycogen biosynthetic process; regulation of transcription, DNA-templated; transmembrane receptor protein tyrosine kinase signaling pathway; male sex determination; positive regulation of transcription, DNA-templated; epidermis development; cellular response to insulin stimulus; protein autophosphorylation; positive regulation of respiratory burst; positive regulation of MAPK cascade; exocrine pancreas development; G protein-coupled receptor signaling pathway; male gonad development; phosphorylation; carbohydrate metabolic process; positive regulation of DNA replication; peptidyl-tyrosine autophosphorylation; activation of protein kinase B activity; positive regulation of cell migration; positive regulation of nitric oxide biosynthetic process; cellular response to growth factor stimulus; heart morphogenesis; adrenal gland development; positive regulation of cell population proliferation; positive regulation of glycolytic process; activation of protein kinase activity; signal transduction; glucose homeostasis; peptidyl-tyrosine phosphorylation; protein heterotetramerization; intracellular signal transduction; receptor-mediated endocytosis; learning; memory; positive regulation of phosphatidylinositol 3-kinase signaling; positive regulation of protein-containing complex disassembly; anatomical structure development; dendritic spine maintenance; amyloid-beta clearance; neuron projection maintenance
Sources:Amigo / QuickGO
Orthologs
Databases	NCBI: entry; OMA: entry
Species	Human	Mouse
Entrez	3643	16337
Ensembl	ENSG00000171105	ENSMUSG00000005534
UniProt	P06213	P15208
RefSeq (mRNA)	NM_000208; NM_001079817	NM_010568; NM_001330056
RefSeq (protein)	NP_000199; NP_001073285	NP_001316985; NP_034698
Location (UCSC)	Chr 19: 7.11 – 7.29 Mb	Chr 8: 3.17 – 3.33 Mb
PubMed search
- Wikidata
View/Edit Human	View/Edit Mouse

The insulin receptor (IR) is a transmembrane receptor that is activated by insulin, IGF-I, IGF-II and belongs to the large class of receptor tyrosine kinase. Metabolically, the insulin receptor plays a key role in the regulation of glucose homeostasis; a functional process that under degenerate conditions may result in a range of clinical manifestations including diabetes and cancer. Insulin signalling controls access to blood glucose in body cells. When insulin falls, especially in those with high insulin sensitivity, body cells begin only to have access to lipids that do not require transport across the membrane. So, in this way, insulin is the key regulator of fat metabolism as well. Biochemically, the insulin receptor is encoded by a single gene INSR, from which alternate splicing during transcription results in either IR-A or IR-B isoforms. Downstream post-translational events of either isoform result in the formation of a proteolytically cleaved α and β subunit, which upon combination are ultimately capable of homo or hetero-dimerisation to produce the ≈320 kDa disulfide-linked transmembrane insulin receptor.

== Structure ==
Initially, transcription of alternative splice variants derived from the INSR gene are translated to form one of two monomeric isomers; IR-A in which exon 11 is excluded, and IR-B in which exon 11 is included. Inclusion of exon 11 results in the addition of 12 amino acids upstream of the intrinsic furin proteolytic cleavage site.

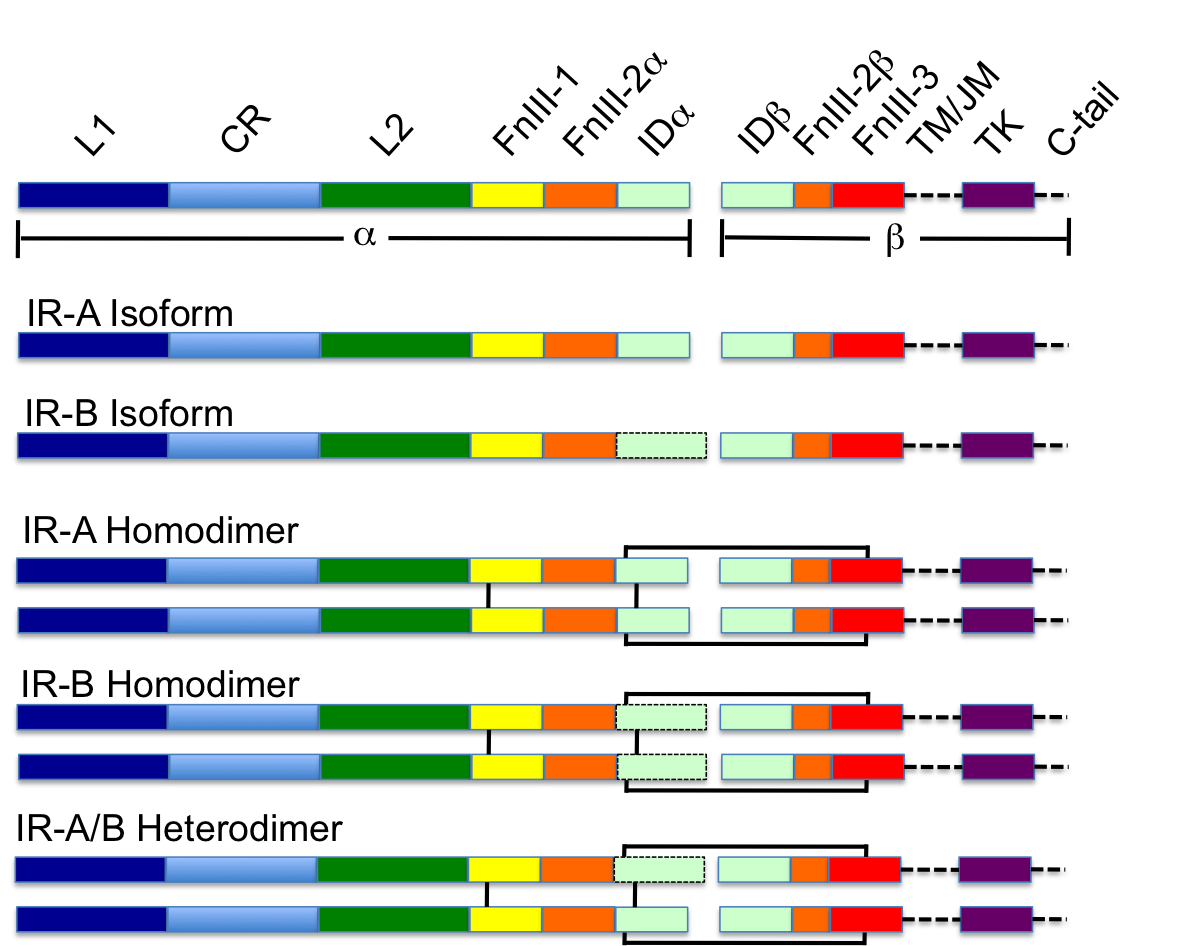
Colour-coded schematic of the insulin receptor

Upon receptor dimerisation, after proteolytic cleavage into the α- and β-chains, the additional 12 amino acids remain present at the C-terminus of the α-chain (designated αCT) where they are predicted to influence receptor–ligand interaction.

Each isometric monomer is structurally organized into 8 distinct domains consists of; a leucine-rich repeat domain (L1, residues 1–157), a cysteine-rich region (CR, residues 158–310), an additional leucine rich repeat domain (L2, residues 311–470), three fibronectin type III domains; FnIII-1 (residues 471–595), FnIII-2 (residues 596–808) and FnIII-3 (residues 809–906). Additionally, an insert domain (ID, residues 638–756) resides within FnIII-2, containing the α/β furin cleavage site, from which proteolysis results in both IDα and IDβ domains. Within the β-chain, downstream of the FnIII-3 domain lies a transmembrane helix (TH) and intracellular juxtamembrane (JM) region, just upstream of the intracellular tyrosine kinase (TK) catalytic domain, responsible for subsequent intracellular signaling pathways.

Upon cleavage of the monomer to its respective α- and β-chains, receptor hetero or homo-dimerisation is maintained covalently between chains by a single disulphide link and between monomers in the dimer by two disulphide links extending from each α-chain. The overall 3D ectodomain structure, possessing four ligand binding sites, resembles an inverted 'V', with the each monomer rotated approximately 2-fold about an axis running parallel to the inverted 'V' and L2 and FnIII-1 domains from each monomer forming the inverted 'V's apex.

== Ligand binding ==
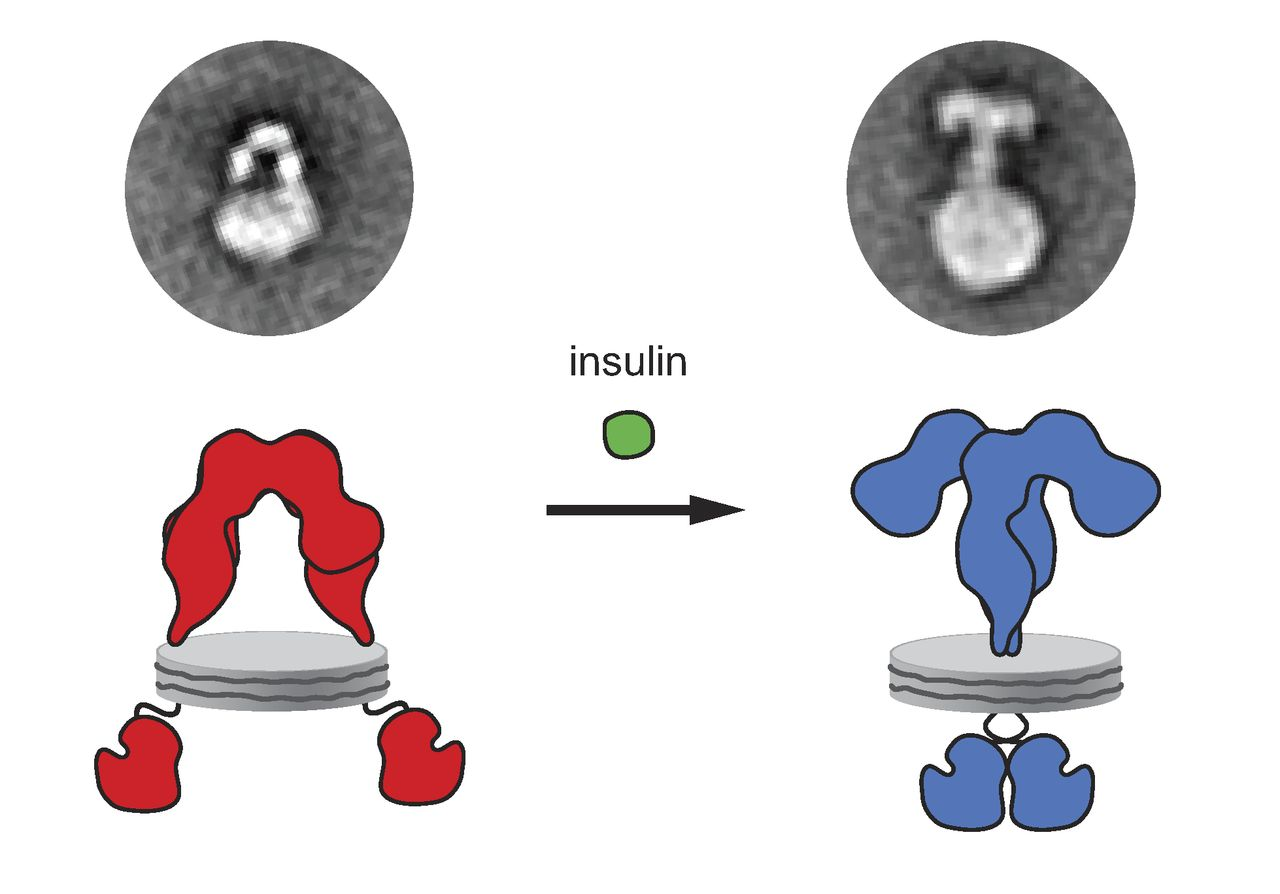
Ligand-induced conformation changes in the full-length human insulin receptor reconstituted in nanodiscs. Left - unactivated receptor conformation; right - insulin-activated receptor conformation. The changes are visualized with the electron microscopy of an individual molecule (upper panel) and schematically depicted as a cartoon (lower panel).

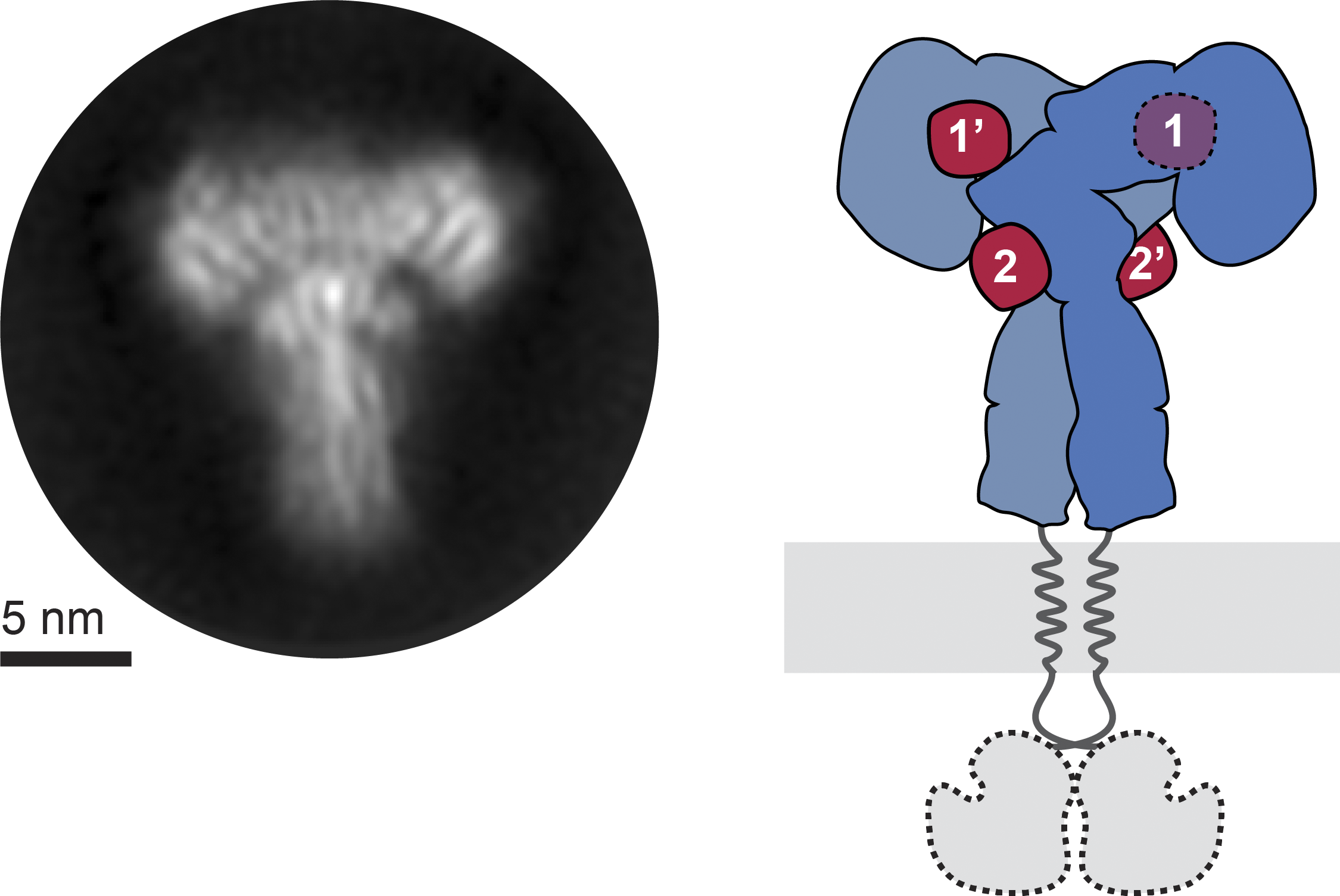
Left - cryo-EM structure of the ligand-saturated IR ectodomain; right - 4 binding sites and IR structure upon binding schematically depicted as a cartoon.

The insulin receptor's endogenous ligands include insulin, IGF-I and IGF-II. Using a cryo-EM, structural insight into conformational changes upon insulin binding was provided. Binding of ligand to the α-chains of the IR dimeric ectodomain shifts it from an inverted V-shape to a T-shaped conformation, and this change is propagated structurally to the transmembrane domains, which get closer, eventually leading to autophosphorylation of various tyrosine residues within the intracellular TK domain of the β-chain. These changes facilitate the recruitment of specific adapter proteins such as the insulin receptor substrate proteins (IRS) in addition to SH2-B (Src Homology 2 - B ), APS and protein phosphatases, such as PTP1B, eventually promoting downstream processes involving blood glucose homeostasis.

Strictly speaking the relationship between IR and ligand shows complex allosteric properties. This was indicated with the use of a Scatchard plots which identified that the measurement of the ratio of IR bound ligand to unbound ligand does not follow a linear relationship with respect to changes in the concentration of IR bound ligand, suggesting that the IR and its respective ligand share a relationship of cooperative binding. Furthermore, the observation that the rate of IR-ligand dissociation is accelerated upon addition of unbound ligand implies that the nature of this cooperation is negative; said differently, that the initial binding of ligand to the IR inhibits further binding to its second active site - exhibition of allosteric inhibition.

These models state that each IR monomer possesses 2 insulin binding sites; site 1, which binds to the 'classical' binding surface of insulin: consisting of L1 plus αCT domains and site 2, consisting of loops at the junction of FnIII-1 and FnIII-2 predicted to bind to the 'novel' hexamer face binding site of insulin. As each monomer contributing to the IR ectodomain exhibits 3D 'mirrored' complementarity, N-terminal site 1 of one monomer ultimately faces C-terminal site 2 of the second monomer, where this is also true for each monomers mirrored complement (the opposite side of the ectodomain structure). Current literature distinguishes the complement binding sites by designating the second monomer's site 1 and site 2 nomenclature as either site 3 and site 4 or as site 1' and site 2' respectively. As such, these models state that each IR may bind to an insulin molecule (which has two binding surfaces) via 4 locations, being site 1, 2, (3/1') or (4/2'). As each site 1 proximally faces site 2, upon insulin binding to a specific site, 'crosslinking' via ligand between monomers is predicted to occur (i.e. as [monomer 1 Site 1 - Insulin - monomer 2 Site (4/2')] or as [monomer 1 Site 2 - Insulin - monomer 2 site (3/1')]). In accordance with current mathematical modelling of IR-insulin kinetics, there are two important consequences to the events of insulin crosslinking; 1. that by the aforementioned observation of negative cooperation between IR and its ligand that subsequent binding of ligand to the IR is reduced and 2. that the physical action of crosslinking brings the ectodomain into such a conformation that is required for intracellular tyrosine phosphorylation events to ensue (i.e. these events serve as the requirements for receptor activation and eventual maintenance of blood glucose homeostasis).

Visualization of full length IR complexes is not yet available due to many constraints. Visualization of full length IR–insulin complexes is not yet available due to flexible link of transmembrane (TM) domains with extracellular domain and intracellular domain. The transmembrane (TM) domains are critical for activation and downstream signaling. Stabilization of TM domains may be result of phosphatidylinositol. Meanwhile, visualization of full length IR–downstream proteins is challenging because of transient nature of association, the phosphorylation receptor requirement, and the unfixed relative orientation.

Applying cryo-EM and molecular dynamics simulations of receptor reconstituted in nanodiscs, the structure of the entire dimeric insulin receptor ectodomain with four insulin molecules bound was visualized, therefore confirming and directly showing biochemically predicted 4 binding locations.

=== Agonists ===
- 4548-G05
- Insulin
- Insulin-like growth factor 1
- Mecasermin

A number of small-molecule insulin receptor agonists have been identified.

== Signal transduction pathway ==
The insulin receptor is a type of tyrosine kinase receptor, in which the binding of an agonistic ligand triggers autophosphorylation of the tyrosine residues, with each subunit phosphorylating its partner. The addition of the phosphate groups generates a binding site for the insulin receptor substrate (IRS-1), which is subsequently activated via phosphorylation. The activated IRS-1 initiates the signal transduction pathway and binds to phosphoinositide 3-kinase (PI3K), in turn causing its activation. This then catalyses the conversion of Phosphatidylinositol 4,5-bisphosphate into Phosphatidylinositol 3,4,5-trisphosphate (PIP_{3}). PIP_{3} acts as a secondary messenger and induces the activation of phosphatidylinositol dependent protein kinase, which then activates several other kinases – most notably protein kinase B, (PKB, also known as Akt). PKB triggers the translocation of glucose transporter (GLUT4) containing vesicles to the cell membrane, via the activation of SNARE proteins, to facilitate the diffusion of glucose into the cell. PKB also phosphorylates and inhibits glycogen synthase kinase, which is an enzyme that inhibits glycogen synthase. Therefore, PKB acts to start the process of glycogenesis, which ultimately reduces blood-glucose concentration.

Signal transduction of Insulin
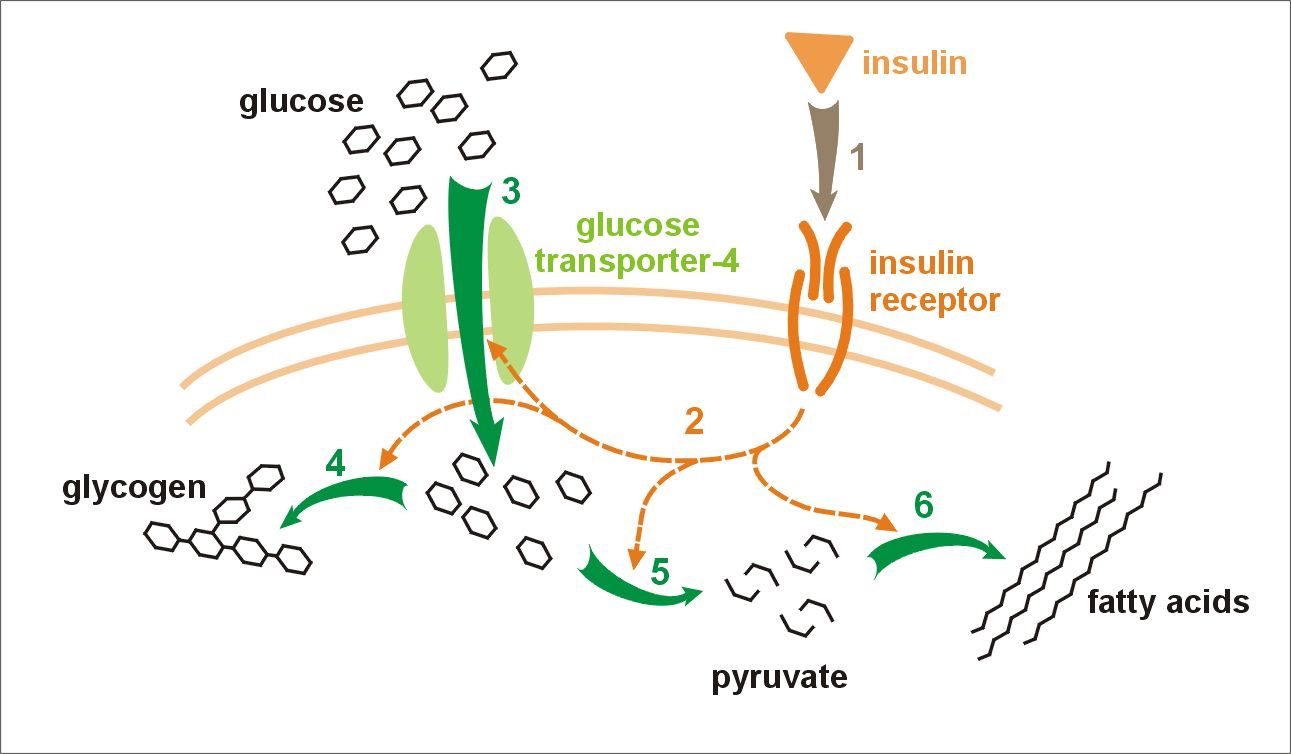
Effect of insulin on glucose uptake and metabolism. Insulin binds to its receptor (1), which, in turn, starts many protein activation cascades (2). These include: translocation of Glut-4 transporter to the plasma membrane and influx of glucose (3), glycogen synthesis (4), glycolysis (5), and fatty acid synthesis (6).

Signal transduction of Insulin: At the end of the transduction process, the activated protein binds to the PIP_{2} phospholipids embedded in the membrane.

== Function ==
=== Regulation of gene expression ===
The activated IRS-1 acts as a secondary messenger within the cell to stimulate the transcription of insulin-regulated genes. First, the protein Grb2 binds the P-Tyr residue of IRS-1 in its SH2 domain. Grb2 is then able to bind SOS, which in turn catalyzes the replacement of bound GDP with GTP on Ras, a G protein. This protein then begins a phosphorylation cascade, culminating in the activation of mitogen-activated protein kinase (MAPK), which enters the nucleus and phosphorylates various nuclear transcription factors (such as Elk1).

=== Stimulation of glycogen synthesis ===
Glycogen synthesis is also stimulated by the insulin receptor via IRS-1. In this case, it is the SH2 domain of PI-3 kinase (PI-3K) that binds the P-Tyr of IRS-1. Now activated, PI-3K can convert the membrane lipid phosphatidylinositol 4,5-bisphosphate (PIP_{2}) to phosphatidylinositol 3,4,5-triphosphate (PIP_{3}). This indirectly activates a protein kinase, PKB (Akt), via phosphorylation. PKB then phosphorylates several target proteins, including glycogen synthase kinase 3 (GSK-3). GSK-3 is responsible for phosphorylating (and thus deactivating) glycogen synthase. When GSK-3 is phosphorylated, it is deactivated, and prevented from deactivating glycogen synthase. In this roundabout manner, insulin increases glycogen synthesis.

=== Degradation of insulin ===
Once an insulin molecule has docked onto the receptor and effected its action, it may be released back into the extracellular environment or it may be degraded by the cell. Degradation normally involves endocytosis of the insulin-receptor complex followed by the action of insulin degrading enzyme. Most insulin molecules are degraded by liver cells. It has been estimated that a typical insulin molecule is finally degraded about 71 minutes after its initial release into circulation.

=== Immune system ===
Besides the metabolic function, insulin receptors are also expressed on immune cells, such as macrophages, B cells, and T cells. On T cells, the expression of insulin receptors is undetectable during the resting state but up-regulated upon T-cell receptor (TCR) activation. Indeed, insulin has been shown when supplied exogenously to promote in vitro T cell proliferation in animal models. Insulin receptor signalling is important for maximizing the potential effect of T cells during acute infection and inflammation.

== Pathology ==
The main activity of activation of the insulin receptor is inducing glucose uptake. For this reason "insulin insensitivity", or a decrease in insulin receptor signaling, leads to diabetes mellitus type 2 – the cells are unable to take up glucose, and the result is hyperglycemia (an increase in circulating glucose), and all the sequelae that result from diabetes.

Patients with insulin resistance may display acanthosis nigricans.

A few patients with homozygous mutations in the INSR gene have been described, which causes Donohue syndrome or Leprechaunism. This autosomal recessive disorder results in a totally non-functional insulin receptor. These patients have low-set, often protuberant, ears, flared nostrils, thickened lips, and severe growth retardation. In most cases, the outlook for these patients is extremely poor, with death occurring within the first year of life. Other mutations of the same gene cause the less severe Rabson-Mendenhall syndrome, in which patients have characteristically abnormal teeth, hypertrophic gingiva (gums), and enlargement of the pineal gland. Both diseases present with fluctuations of the glucose level: After a meal the glucose is initially very high, and then falls rapidly to abnormally low levels. Other genetic mutations to the insulin receptor gene can cause Severe Insulin Resistance.

== Interactions ==
Insulin receptor has been shown to interact with

- ENPP1,
- GRB10,
- GRB7,
- IRS1,
- MAD2L1,
- PRKCD,
- PTPN11, and
- SH2B1.
