= Patterson syndrome =

- Other names: Pseudoleprechaunism syndrome, Patterson type
- Named after: Joseph Hanan Patterson

Patterson syndrome, also called pseudoleprechaunism, is an extremely rare syndrome, first mistaken as Donohue syndrome (also known as leprechaunism).

It is named for Dr. Joseph Hanan Patterson. It was described by Patterson and Watkins in 1962. The pathogenesis and cause of the Patterson syndrome was unknown until 1981.

== Signs and symptoms ==
Patterson syndrome is characterized by the patient's having an unusual facial look, similar to that caused by leprechaunism. It primarily affects the connective tissue and the neuroendocrine system, giving rise to bronzed hyperpigmentation, cutis laxa of the hands and feet, bodily disproportion, intellectual disability, and major bony deformities. Radiographs reveal a characteristic generalised skeletal dysplasia.

It comprises endocrine abnormality, hyperadrenocorticism, cushingoid features, and diabetes mellitus. One other case has shown premature adrenarche.
