= Qiu Zilong =

Chinese neuroscientist

- Born: December 1976 (age 49); Beijing, China
- Education: Shanghai Jiao Tong University School of Medicine (BS); Shanghai Institutes for Biological Sciences (PhD)
- Known for: Human gene editing
- Scientific career
- Fields: Neuroscience
- Workplaces: University of California, San Diego; Shanghai Institutes for Biological Sciences; Shanghai Jiao Tong University School of Medicine
- Academic advisors: Anirvan Ghosh

Qiu Zilong (Chinese: 仇子龙; pinyin: Qiú Zǐlóng; born December 1976) is a Chinese biologist and neuroscientist who made important contributions in gene therapy for autism. In 2016, while working at the Shanghai Institutes for Biological Sciences, Chinese Academy of Sciences, he and his team created the first genetically modified monkeys that showed autistic behaviour (Rett syndrome). After developing a gene therapy technique for Rett syndrome, he founded a company, Lanqi Xintu Gene Technology, in 2023.

In 2026, as a principal investigator of neuroscience at the Shanghai Jiao Tong University School of Medicine, Qiu announced that it was possible to repair a pathogenic mutation of CHD3 (chromodomain-helicase-DNA-binding protein 3) gene that causes impairment of brain and intellectual development (Snijders Blok–Campeau syndrome) using gene manipulation method called base editing in mice and monkeys. The experiment published in the journal Nature was followed by an investigation from Retraction Watch, which published its report in Science. It was revealed that Qiu had used the same technique in humans. In 2025, Qiu treated a six-year-old girl who was cared for the Snijders Blok–Campeau syndrome at Xinhua Hospital, the university's hospital. The girl died a week after the treatment and the story was kept secret.

== Biography ==
Qiu was born in Beijing, China in December 1976. He moved to Anhui, eastern China, where he spent the rest of his childhood. In 1994, he entered Shanghai Jiao Tong University in Shanghai, and graduated in 1998 with a BS degree in biology. He enrolled in a PhD course at the Shanghai Institute of Biochemistry and Cell Biology (later Shanghai Institutes for Biological Sciences), of the Chinese Academy of Sciences. His research, supervised by Kan Liao, was on the molecular mechanism of adipocyte differentiation. In 2003, he earned his doctorate and moved to the University of California, San Diego for post-doctoral research. His mentor Anirvan Ghosh was a neuroscientist who was recently appointed the Stephen Kuffler Professor holding the chair of neurobiology in the Division of Biological Sciences. With Ghosh, Qiu investigated on the mechanism of gene expression in brain cells that controls the development and function nervous system.

Based on their research, Ghosh advised Qiu to look for research funding to study brain functions related to disease, particularly autism. In 2006, Qiu met Monica Coenraads, the co-founder and scientific director of the Rett Syndrome Research Foundation (RSRF). It was the first time Qiu heard of the disease. Coenraads had a daughter who was born with the disease, described as a "severe subtype of autism spectrum disorder", and wanted an able researcher in the field. With her help, Qiu started a research on autism and received the RSRF research grant in 2007.

In 2009, Qiu became Principal Investigator and the Head of the Laboratory of Molecular Basis of Neural Plasticity at the Institute of Neuroscience, Shanghai Institutes for Biological Sciences. For the medical aspects of his research on autism, he became affiliated with the university's Xinhua Hospital, as well as the Shanghai Mental Health Center and the Center for Excellence in Brain Science and Intelligence Technology. In 2023, he joined the faculty of neurology at the Shanghai Jiao Tong University School of Medicine.

As of 2026, Qiu is a member of the scientific advisory board of the US MEF2C Foundation.

== Scientific contributions ==
=== Autism ===
Rett syndrome is a neurological disorder having autistic symptoms mainly in girls, with an incidence of 1/10 000 to 1/15 000 live births. In 1999, Huda Y. Zoghbi and her team at the Howard Hughes Medical Institute, Baylor College of Medicine, Houston, discovered that the genetic cause was due to a mutation in the gene MECP2 that is present on X chromosome. It became necessary to understand how the mutation started and caused the disease to find the ultimate treatment. Working with Ghosh, Qiu started experimental investigation on the molecular mechanism of the MECP2 expression and interaction in cell signalling pathways. In 2012, Qiu reported the role of the MECP2 protein in defective synaptic transmission.

As Qiu moved to Shanghai Institutes for Biological Sciences in 2009, he expanded his research scope on other neurological disorders and different types of autism. In 2012, he identified an MECP2 mutation in two Chinese brothers indicating that the gene is crucial in the development of autism, and not just Rett syndrome. As medication for these brain diseases was hard to develop, he turned his attention to gene therapy.

==== Genetically modified animals ====
In 2014, Qiu and his team reported creation of a genetically modified cynomolgus monkey (Macaca fascicularis). A male baby monkey was born from in vitro fertilization with experimentally induced MECP2 mutation, but it did not survive. To check the issues in the gene transfer system, they developed in 2015 a refined method using lentiviral technology by which a highly purified virus could be used for carrying edited genes (the base pairs). The modified lentiviral transfer method was a success, as they reported a creation of monkeys with induced autism, in Nature in 2016, stating:

[The] human MECP2 transgene was successfully incorporated into the monkey genome and specifically expressed in the monkey's brain... Notably, we succeeded in generating five F_{1} offspring of MECP2 transgenic monkeys by intracytoplasmic sperm injection with sperm from one F_{0} transgenic monkey, showing germline transmission and Mendelian segregation of several MECP2 transgenes in the F_{1} progeny. Moreover, F_{1} transgenic monkeys also showed reduced social interactions [autistic behaviour] when tested in pairs, as compared to wild-type monkeys of similar age.

The report was a global news headline as it was the first successful experiment of induced autism in primates. The five mutant monkeys produced more grunts, coos and screams, and also showed less social interaction that normal monkeys, which indicate symptoms of autism and Rett syndrome. In 2020, Qiu team announced an experiment in which autistic conditions in the brain could be reversed in mice using CRISPR gene editing. After mice were induced with MECP2 mutations, the MECP2 protein level was then reduced by gene editing, specifically in the medial prefrontal cortex (mPFC). This was an indication that mPFC is the controlling brain region for the social recognition deficit in autism and that it may be possible to use as a treatment in humans.

In 2023, Qiu's team reported a more advanced gene editing in mice. Using an in vivo whole-brain genome editing, they were able to correct MEF2C mutation and reversed autistic symptoms. MEF2C (myocyte-specific enhancer factor 2C) is another gene that has been established to be one of the causes of autism. It is responsible for neuronal development in an embryo and absence (due to a mutation – deletion) results in neurological disorders including the severe form of autism. Upon the publication in Nature Neuroscience, Qiu announced the prospects, saying, "We're making preparations to enter human clinical trials. We'll first do safety experiments on macaques, and if that goes well for one to two years, we can enter human clinical trials."

=== Gene therapy ===
Qiu understood that for complex genetic diseases like autism, it will be difficult to develop medications and that gene therapy would be a much better option. With his colleague Ju Cheng, he wrote in Neurosignals in 2010 about the challenges and problems of using gene therapy:

The therapeutic development for a certain group of genetic disorders will take years and collaboration between different industries to achieve efficient drugs. Given the complexity for ASD, more thorough mechanistic studies are needed in order to find target genes for therapeutic designs.

By 2024, scientists in US and Canada had several drugs potentially good for autism, but none turned out to be a reliable cure. Qiu expressed his concern, saying, "Even if foreign countries successfully develop these drugs, they will undoubtedly be prohibitively expensive and beyond the reach of ordinary Chinese families." By 2019, his main aim was to develop a base editing method that could easily correct mutant base pairs and then introduce the corrected sequence into diseased individuals.

Qiu made significant development in the field, such as efficient lentiviral transfer method that he developed in 2015, in vivo genome editing system, called HDR-based Cas9/RecA system developed in 2019 and was used to correct Pde6b mutation (the cause of visual impairment) in mice, adenoviral delivery technique developed in 2021 (patented in 2023) and for which he founded a company Lanqi Xintu Gene Technology, production of miniature cytosine and adenine base editors using CRISPR gene editing that was developed in 2023, a safe to use cytosine base editor, called YE1, developed in 2023, and an in vivo RNA base editing tool called professional APOBECs (ProAPOBECs) developed in 2025. Using ProAPOBECs, Qiu's team were able to edit MEF2C in the brain of an autism mouse model and the treated mouse lost autistic behaviours.

==== Gene therapy in mice ====
In 2026, Qiu and his team reported a successful restoration of CHD3 gene mutation in mice. The CHD3 protein is an enzyme that plays vital roles in genome organisation (chromatin remodelling and histone deacetylation), and point mutation in it causes a genetic disease called Snijders Blok–Campeau syndrome that involves impaired brain development, some of the symptoms of which are similar to autism. Qiu's team first created a genetically modified mice that carry mutant CHD3. The induced mutation reduced the CHD3 protein levels by 50% that produced neurological abnormalities characteristics of the Snijders Blok–Campeau syndrome. Then, they administered base editor (TadA-embedded adenine base editor or TeABE) using adenoviral delivery system into the brain of mutant mice. The base editor made a correction from A•T to G•C after which the mice showed improved brain performance.

The experiment published in Nature on 18 February 2026 titled "In vivo base editing of Chd3 rescues behavioural abnormalities in mice" concluded:

These findings establish in vivo base editing as a viable therapeutic approach for CHD3-related neurodevelopmental disease. More broadly, they demonstrate that precise single-base correction in the postnatal brain can restore protein dosage and function, thereby offering a framework for the treatment of monogenic neurodevelopmental disorders.

== Controversy ==
Although Qiu team's report on CHD3 gene therapy in Nature explicitly mentions a study in mice, in which the experiment was successful, the information also contains experiments on monkeys. The gene correction in monkeys was reported successful, concluding the outcomes as a justification for human application:

These results provide compelling evidence for the efficacy of TeABE in the NHP [nonhuman primates] brain, paving the way for the application of TeABE in clinical trials. This study represents a substantial advancement in gene therapy for brain disorders and highlights the transformative potential of base editing in treating genetic neurodevelopmental disorders.

When Brendan Borrell, a journalist for Retraction Watch and supported by Science, made a journalistic investigation into the breakthrough gene therapy, disastrous secrets came to light. The details of the monkey experiment showed hidden results and severe adverse effects. One monkey which was given a high dose of virus (the gene editor carrier) developed kidney damage. Three monkeys also developed moderate to serious liver damages.

While the Nature reporter Kevin J. Bender announced the experiment on 18 February 2026 with a remark: "For such gene-editing approaches to progress to clinical use, a suitable method for safely delivering the base editor to the brain must be developed," Borrell's report in Science on 23 July 2026 revealed that the clinical trail was already done by Qiu, but was maintained in secrecy.

=== Human experiment ===
The story behind the experiment originated in 2023 when Qiu patented adenoviral delivery method for gene therapy and delivered a public lecture about it in July. Among the audience were a couple Jason and Linda (pseudonyms), whose six-year-old daughter Mei had just been diagnosed with Snijders Blok–Campeau syndrome. Jason and Linda approached Qiu for the possibility of the gene therapy for Mei. As it was known that people have died of gene therapy, like Jesse Gelsinger, Qiu had to convince the couple with his research data. Mei's parents agreed that they were willing to bear the expenses, and initially gave US$130,000. It was only after this fund that Qiu worked on the Snijders Blok–Campeau syndrome, starting the experiments on mice and then monkeys. Success on inducing and reversing the disease in mice was achieved in late 2024. The manuscript for the study was submitted to Nature on 21 December 2024.

Based on the positive results, Xinhua Hospital issued an ethical permission on 2 January 2025 to perform clinical trial on Mei. A follow-up experiment on monkeys showed dangerous results such as liver damages and kidney failure leading to death, but this information was not included in the ethics approval application. On 24 March 2025, Mei was given the gene therapy. After developing high fever on 28 March, and later unable to urinate, she was pronounced dead on 30 March. The hospital ethics board announced the cause of death as thrombotic microangiopathy (blockage of blood vessel due to clotting), the same symptoms as the monkey that died of kidney failure. By the end of the clinical trial, Mei's parents had contributed US$860,000.

==== Consequences ====
In September 2025, Shanghai district health department imposed a penalty of US$3,600 to Xinhua Hospital "for failing to properly oversee the trial and not registering it as commercially sponsored research on the national database", and Yongguo Yu, the supervising physician, was verbally reprimanded. Mei's parents did not receive any compensation, except from one of the researchers who returned US$100,000. The funding was not mentioned in the research paper which was against the journal policy. On learning the Nature paper, Mei's parents felt deceived for not mentioning the failure of the experiment, about Mei and their financial contribution, demanded Shanghai Jiao Tong University School of Medicine to take actions. On 26 July 2026, the university issued a statement announcing an initiation of inquiry into the matter.

Mei's parents informed Nature about Mei's case only to receive an explanation that the research "fall outside our purview in terms of data integrity", and it was more appropriate to move the case to the university. Then they requested the university to retract the Nature paper, which the university rejected. The deputy editor of Nature, Victoria Aranda told CNN that "No information that a human trial was planned or ongoing was ever shared with us" and that the journal would make an investigation. Scientists also notified Nature of their suspicion on the research data, as David Sanders of Purdue University remarked about the monkey brain image, that it was "completely unconvincing." On 29 July 2026, the editor of Nature issued a note of concern that reads:

Readers are alerted that concerns have been raised regarding this article, including with the data presented. Further editorial action will be taken if appropriate as soon as the investigation into the concerns is complete and all parties have been given an opportunity to respond in full.

Mei's parents directly requested Qiu to withdraw the publication to which Qiu said he would, but kept silent afterwards. On the same day, Xinhua Hospital removed the Nature paper from its website.

== Honours and awards ==
In 2016, Qiu received the "National Outstanding Youth Science Fund" from the National Natural Science Foundation of China. He was also selected as one of the "Outstanding Young Science and Technological Innovation Talent" recipients of the Shanghai Branch of the Chinese Academy of Sciences. In 2018, he was awarded "Innovative Talent Promotion Plan" of the Chinese Ministry of Science and Technology.
