= Mitral facies =

- Differential diagnosis: mitral stenosis

Mitral facies is a distinctive facial appearance associated with mitral stenosis.

Someone with mitral stenosis may present with rosy cheeks, whilst the rest of the face has a bluish tinge due to cyanosis. This is especially so in severe mitral stenosis. Because low cardiac output in mitral stenosis produces vasoconstriction, peripheral cyanosis is often seen in the lips, the tip of nose, and the cheeks. Occasionally, along with these, malar flush is seen, because of vasodilation (vascular stasis) in the malar area.
