= Binder's syndrome =

- Specialty: Medical genetics

Binder's syndrome, Binder syndrome or maxillo-nasal dysplasia is a developmental disorder primarily affecting the anterior part of the maxilla and nasal complex (nose and jaw). It is a rare disorder and the causes are unclear.

The characteristics of the syndrome are typically visible. The syndrome involves hypoplasia of variable severity of cartilaginous nasal septum and premaxilla. It includes complete total absence of the anterior nasal spine. There are also associated anomalies of muscle insertions of the upper lip and the nasal floor and of the cervical spine. Affected individuals typically have an unusually flat, underdeveloped midface (midfacial hypoplasia), with an abnormally short nose and flat nasal bridge. They have an underdeveloped upper jaw, relatively protruding lower jaw with anterior mandibular vertical excess and a Class III skeletal and dental (reverse overjet) profile. They have a small frontal sinus and global facial imbalance.

Treatment is encouraged as early as possible with posteroanterior traction on the maxilla and, at about age 8, reinsertion of the nasolabial muscles onto the anterior border of the cartilaginous system. Many who have a severe case of the disorder undergo plastic surgery or orthodontic treatment for cosmetic reasons.
