= Elfin facies =

Group of facial features

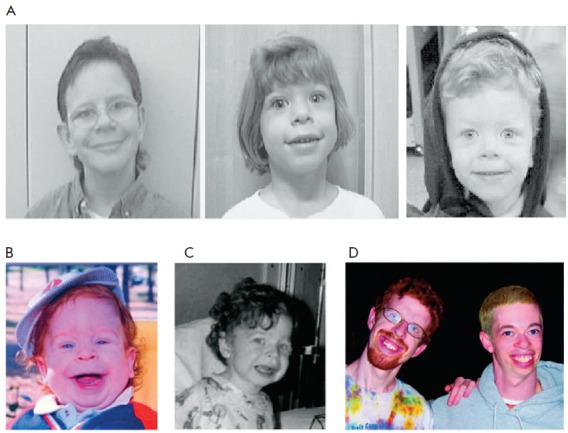
Examples of facial features characteristic of Williams Syndrome

Elfin (Elven) facies is the form of facies in which the patient has facial characteristics like those traditionally associated with elves. It is characterized by a prominent forehead, widely spaced eyes, an upturned nose, an underdeveloped mandible, dental hypoplasia, and patulous lips.

It can be associated with Williams syndrome and Donohue syndrome (leprechaunism).
