= The Nabataean Agriculture =

10th-century Arabic text

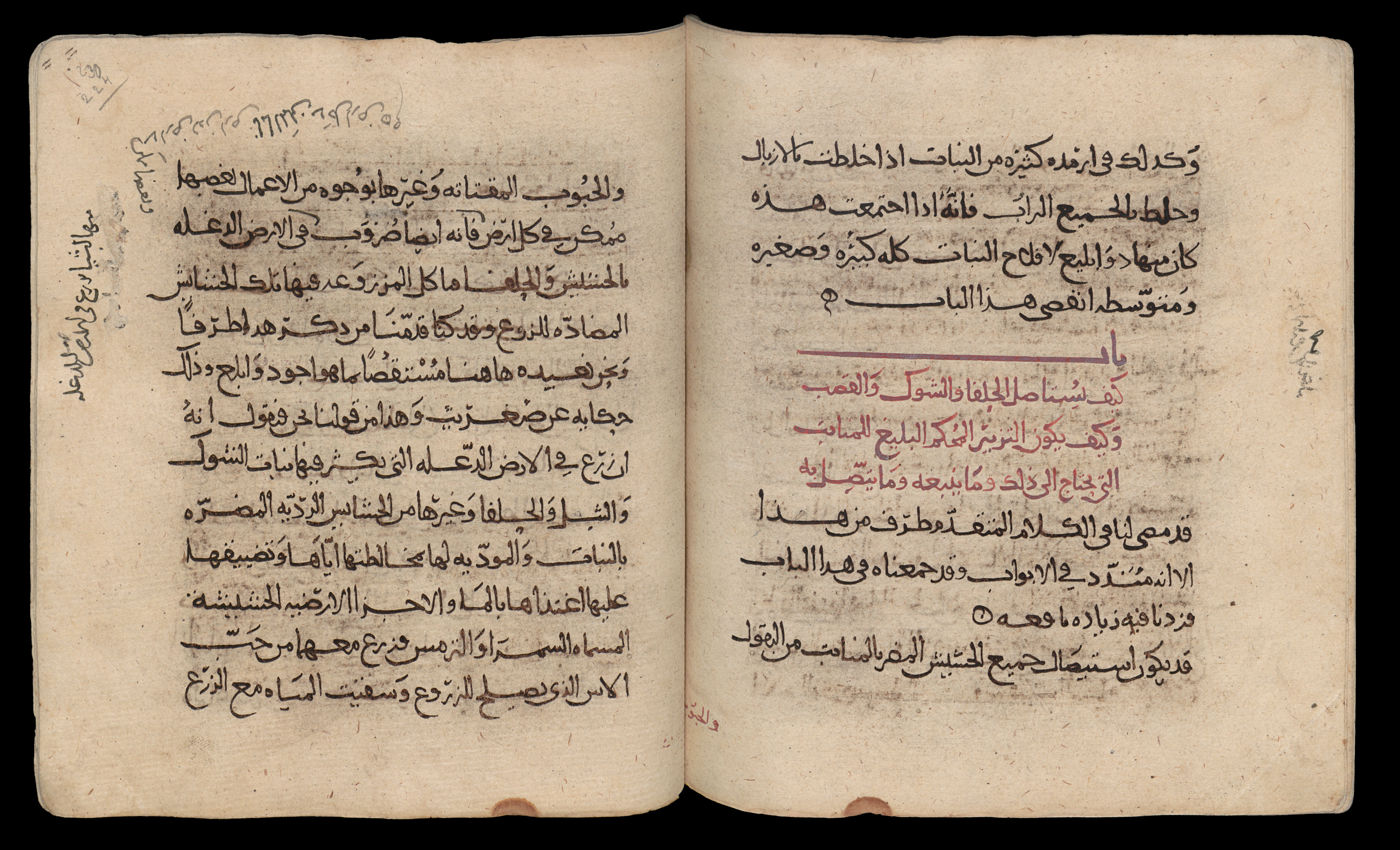
- Excerpt discussing weeds and grass from a 14th-century manuscript of The Nabataean Agriculture
- Author: Ibn Wahshiyya
- Original title: al-Filāḥa al-Nabaṭiyya (الفلاحة النبطية)
- Language: Arabic
- Subject: Agriculture, occult sciences
- Publication place: Iraq

The Nabataean Agriculture (Arabic: كتاب الفلاحة النبطية, romanized: Kitāb al-Filāḥa al-Nabaṭiyya, lit. 'Book of the Nabataean Agriculture'), also written The Nabatean Agriculture, is a 10th-century text on agronomy by Ibn Wahshiyya (born in Qussīn, present-day Iraq; died c. 930). It contains information on plants and agriculture, as well as on magic and astrology. It was frequently cited by later Arabic writers on these topics.

The Nabataean Agriculture was the first book written in Arabic about agriculture, as well as the most influential. Ibn Wahshiyya claimed that he translated it from a 20,000-year-old Mesopotamian text. Though some doubts remain, modern scholars believe that the work may be translated from a Syriac original of the 5th or 6th century. In any case, the work is ultimately based on Greek and Latin agricultural writings, heavily supplemented with local material.

The work consists of some 1500 manuscript pages, principally concerned with agriculture but also containing lengthy digressions on religion, philosophy, magic, astrology, and folklore. Some of the most valuable material on agriculture deals with vineyards, arboriculture, irrigation and soil science. This agricultural information became well known throughout the Arabic-Islamic world from Yemen to Spain.

The non-agricultural material in The Nabataean Agriculture paints a vivid picture of rural life in 10th-century Iraq. It describes a pagan religion with connections to ancient Mesopotamian religion tempered by Hellenistic influences. Some of this non-agricultural material was cited by the Andalusian magician and alchemist Maslama al-Qurtubi (died 964) in his Ghayat al-Hakim ("The Goal of the Wise", Latin: Picatrix), while other parts were discussed by the Jewish philosopher Maimonides in his Guide for the Perplexed (c. 1190).

The French Orientalist Étienne Marc Quatremère introduced the work to the European scholarly community in 1835. Most 19th-century scholars dismissed it as a forgery, but from the 1960s onward several researchers have shown increased interest in its authenticity and impact.

== 'Nabataean' ==
The word 'Nabataean' (Arabic: Nabaṭī) in the title of the work does not refer to the ancient Nabataeans, the northern Arab people who established a kingdom at Petra during the late Hellenistic period (c. 150 BCE – 106 AD). Rather, 'Nabataean' is a term used by Arabic authors of the early Islamic period to designate the non-Arabic speaking, rural population of various conquered territories. Thus, we hear of "Nabataean" Kurds and Armenians, as well as of "Nabataeans of the Levant" (the term apparently used by Arabic authors for the ancient Nabataeans of Petra) and "Nabataeans of Iraq". Generally speaking, the term 'Nabataean' was strongly associated with a rural, sedentary way of life, which was perceived as backwards and as thoroughly opposed to the noble, nomadic lifestyle of the Arabs.

The term 'Nabataeans of Iraq' was used to refer to the rural, Aramaic-speaking, native inhabitants of the Sawād, now central and southern Iraq. However, it was also used by scholars like Ibn Wahshiyya (died c. 930) and the historian al-Mas'udi (died 956) to refer to the inhabitants of ancient Mesopotamia. These scholars believed that the ancient Mesopotamians had spoken Syriac, a prestige form of Eastern Aramaic during the 10th century which in reality goes back no further than the first century AD, and that this supposedly Syriac-speaking people had ruled over Mesopotamia from the legendary times of Nimrod until the advent of the Sasanian Empire in the 3rd century. Unlike the term 'Nabataeans of the Levant' then, the term 'Nabataeans of Iraq' did not refer to a historical people, but to an 'Aramaized' understanding of the Mesopotamian heritage.

Given the perceived antiquity of the 'Nabataean' culture of Iraq, Ibn Wahshiyya believed all human knowledge to go back on 'Nabataean' foundations. This idea itself was not exactly a new one: already in the Hellenistic period a secret knowledge was often attributed to the ancient inhabitants of Mesopotamia, referred to in Greek as "Chaldaeans" (compare, for example, the Chaldaean Oracles), a term used (Arabic: Kaldānī) more or less as a synonym of 'Nabataean' by Ibn Wahshiyya and al-Mas'udi. However, in contrast to both earlier Hellenic authors and later Arabic authors such as Sa'id al-Andalusi (1029–1070), Ibn Wahshiyya was in direct contact with a living Mesopotamian tradition, making his "Chaldaeans" or "Nabataeans" more firmly rooted in empirical reality.

Ibn Wahshiyya took great pride in his 'Nabataeans', as well as in the nobility of peasants more generally. Written at a time when ancient Mesopotamian culture was in danger of disappearing due to the Arab conquests, his work can be interpreted as part of the shuʽubiyya, a movement by non-Arab Muslims to reassert their local identities. In this view it is an attempt to celebrate and preserve the 'Nabataean' heritage of Mesopotamia.

== Composition ==
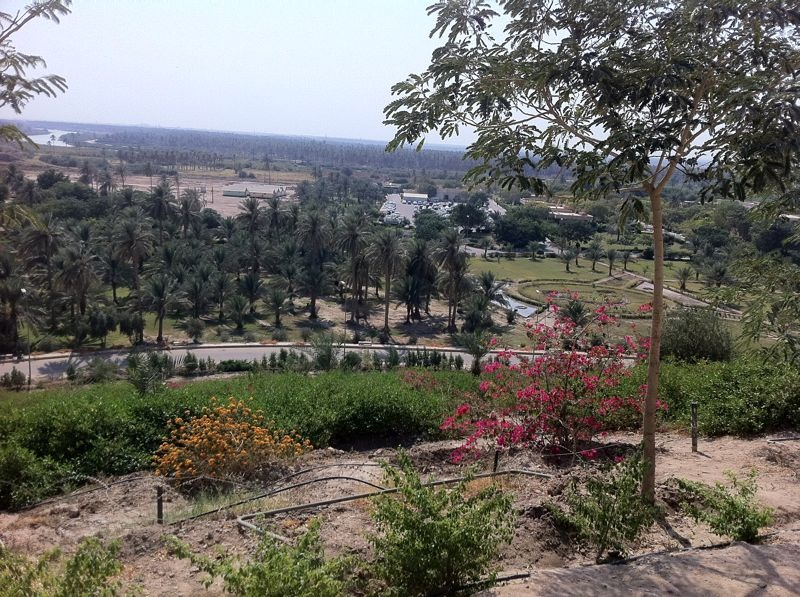
Orchards and palm trees at Babylon, 50 kilometres (31 mi) from Kufa

The work purports to have been compiled by a man named Ibn Wahshiyya from Qussīn, a village near Kufa in present-day Iraq. (Note: On Qussīn, see Yāqūt, Muʽjam al-buldān, IV:350 (referred to by Hämeen-Anttila 2006, p. 93).) It includes a preface in which he gives an account of its origin. (Note: Translated in Hämeen-Anttila 2002a, pp. 69–76.) This preface states that he found the book in a collection of books from the Chaldeans, and that the original was a scroll with 1500 parchment sheets. The original bore the lengthy title Kitāb iflāḥ al-arḍ wa-iṣlāḥ al-zarʽ wa-l-shajar wa-l-thimār wa-dafʽ al-āfāt ʽanhā (“Book of Cultivation of the Land, the Care of Cereals, Vegetables and Crops, and their Protection”), which Ibn Wahshiyya abbreviated to Book of the Nabataean Agriculture. Ibn Wahshiyya claimed that he translated the work from an "ancient Syriac" ("al-Suryāniyya al-qadīma") original, written c. 20,000 years ago by the ancient inhabitants of Mesopotamia. In Ibn Wahshiyya's time, Syriac was thought to have been the primordial language used at the time of creation. In reality, however, Syriac is a dialect of Eastern Aramaic that only emerged in the 1st century, although by the 9th century, it had become the carrier of a rich literature, including many works translated from the Greek. Ibn Wahshiyya said that he translated the text to Arabic in 903/4, and then dictated the translation to his student Abu Talib al-Zayyat in 930/1. These dates are probably accurate, because Ibn al-Nadim lists the book in his Kitab al-Fihrist ("The Book Catalogue") of 987, showing that the book was circulating in Iraq by the end of the 10th century.

Ibn Wahshiyya said that the book was the product of three "ancient wise Kasdanian (Note: Chaldean; the usual Arabic word is al-Kaldani, but Ibn Wahshiyya uses the variants al-Kasdani and al-Kardani.) men", of whom "one of them began it, the second added other things to that, and the third made it complete." These three compilers were named Saghrith, Yanbushad, and Quthama.

Scholarly opinion as to the authenticity of The Nabataean Agriculture has changed over time (see below). While it certainly does not date back to the Babylonian era as Ibn Wahshiyya himself claimed, scholars now believe that the work may actually have been an authentic translation from a pre-Islamic Syriac original. The Finnish scholar Jaakko Hämeen-Anttila proposed a three-stage textual history in 2006:

1. Free paraphrases of passages known from Graeco-Roman agricultural works.
2. Translation into Syriac either by several authors or by a single author (Quthama), probably in the sixth century or soon after...
3. Translation of the putative Syriac text into Arabic by Ibn Wahshiyya (10th c.), who added his own glosses, usually marked as such in the text.

Reconstructing the sources used in the first stage is difficult because the author translated them loosely, added his own material and commentary, and used oral informants to supplement the written sources. However, they must have included a Syriac or Arabic translation of the 4th-century writer Vindonius Anatolius. The author may also have used local sources from outside the Graeco-Roman tradition, such as the lost Rusticatio of Mago the Carthaginian.

The Nabataean Agriculture was the first book written in Arabic about agriculture, although it was preceded by several books on botany and translations of foreign works on agriculture.

== Contents ==
Contents by subject area
Subject area	Percent of the work
Soils, fertilizers, irrigation	5%
Arboriculture, fruit trees	25%
Olive cultivation	3%
Vineyards	16%
Field agriculture	18%
Garden cultivation	23%
Seasonal calendar	7%
Weather almanac	2%

The book contains valuable information on agriculture and its associated lore. It is divided into approximately 150 chapters on olive trees, irrigation, flowers, trees, estate management, soils, legumes, and grains. Amidst its extensive agricultural material the text also contains religious, folkloric, and philosophical content. The style is "repetitive" and "not always completely lucid," according to Hämeen-Anttila; at the same time, Hämeen-Anttila notes that the author's attitude towards agriculture is "sober," and that he appears as a "learned and perspicacious observer." The ecologist Karl Butzer described the organization of the work as "perplexing", even "baffling", as when a treatise on corpses washed out of a cemetery interrupts the section on soils.

=== Agriculture ===
Then I translated this book...after I had translated some other books...I gave a complete and unabridged translation of it because I liked it and I saw the great benefits in it and its usefulness in making the earth prosper, caring for the trees and making the orchards and fields thrive and also because of the discussions in it on the special properties of things, countries and times, as well as on the proper times of labors during the seasons, of the differences of the natures of [different] climates, on their wondrous effects, the grafting of trees, their planting and care, on repelling calamities from them, on making use of plants and herbs, on curing with them and keeping back maladies from the bodies of animals and repelling calamities from trees and plants with the help of each of the plants.

The overall structure of the agricultural information in The Nabataean Agriculture does not match the agricultural context of Mesopotamia, suggesting that the author modeled the work on texts from a Mediterranean environment. For example, the work provides limited coverage of sugar, rice, and cotton, which were the most important local crops in the 9th and 10th centuries. Sesame oil was more common in the region than olive oil, but Ibn Wahshiyya writes about the olive tree for 32 pages, compared to one page for sesame. Nevertheless, the geographic references and detailed information about weather, planting schedules, soil salinity, and other topics show that the author had firsthand knowledge of local conditions in the central Iraqi lowlands near Kufa.

The book describes 106 plants, compared to 70 in the contemporary Geoponica, and offers thorough information on their taxonomic characteristics and medicinal uses. The section on the cultivation of the date palm was an important contribution and wholly original, and the extremely detailed treatment of vineyards goes on for 141 pages. The list of exotic plants, some of which are native only to India or Arabia, may have been based on the botany portions of Pliny's 1st-century Natural History.

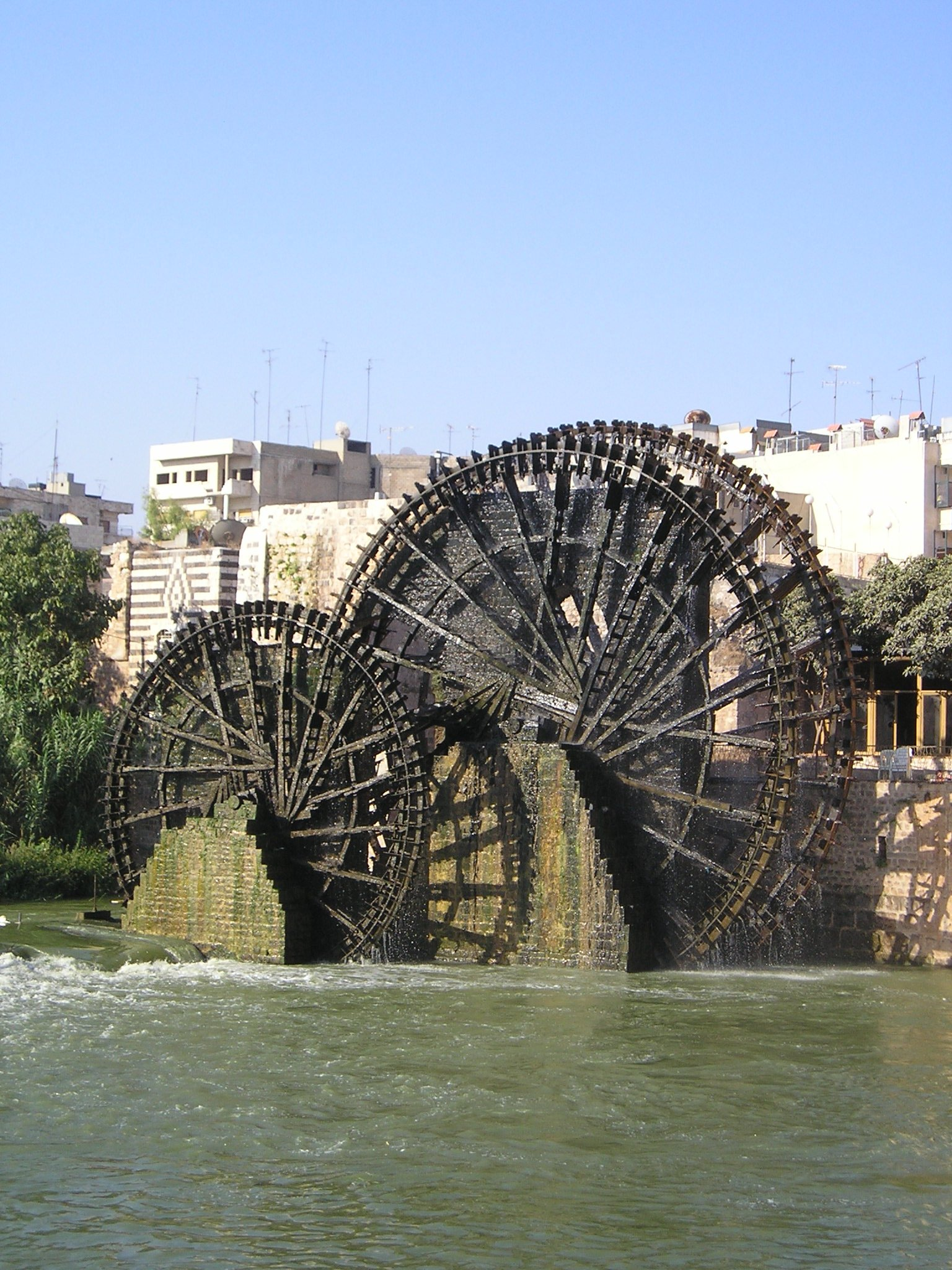
A noria (water wheel) in Syria

In soil science, The Nabataean Agriculture was more advanced than its Greek or Roman predecessors, analyzing the different soil types of the Mesopotamian plains (alluvial, natric, and saline), Syria (red clay), and the Zagros Mountains of northern Iraq (mountain soil). It provided accurate and original recommendations on soil fertilizer. In the area of hydrology and irrigation, the text offers "a treasure trove of information, ideas and subtle symbolism." This includes material on how to dig and line wells and canals, and description of norias (water wheels). Finally, there is a section on farm management, which shows evidence of Roman influence. (Note: Translated into French in Fahd 1970.) Overall, the agronomic contributions of The Nabataean Agriculture are "substantial and far-ranging, including both agronomic and natural history data unknown in the Classical literature."

=== Religion and philosophy ===
For when we see plants, crops, running water, beautiful flowers, verdant spots and pleasing meadows, our souls are often delighted and pleased by this and are relieved and distracted from the sorrows that came to the souls and covered them, just as drinking wine makes one forget one's sorrows. As this is so, then when the vine climbs up the palm tree in such a soil as we have described before, looking at it is like looking at the higher world, and it acts on the souls in a similar manner as the Universal Soul acts on those particular souls that are in us.

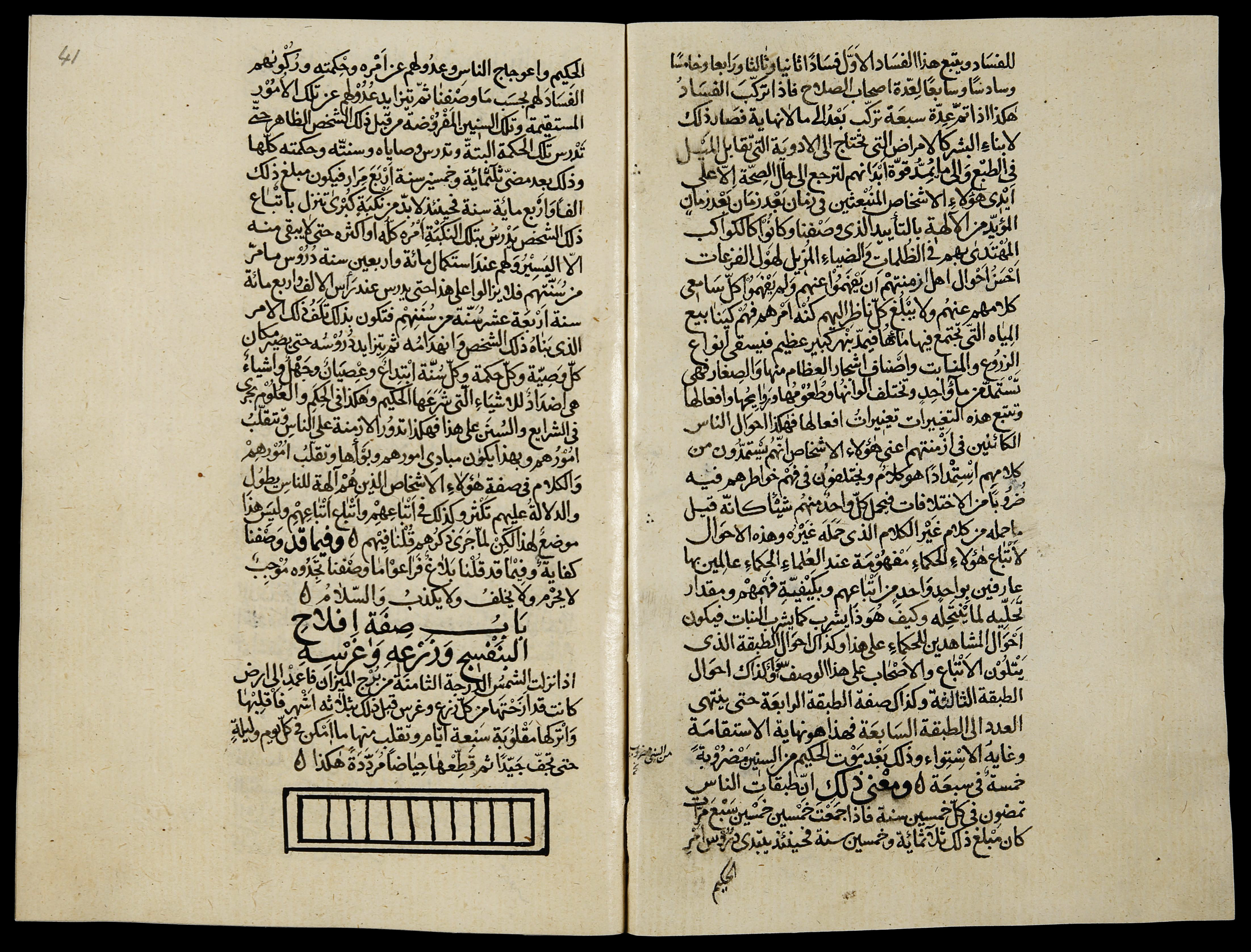
Excerpt containing astronomical-agricultural instructions from a 17th-century manuscript

In various passages the book describes the religious practices of rural Iraq, where paganism persisted long after the Islamic conquest. Some of the book's descriptions suggest links between these Iraqi pagans, whom Ibn Wahshiyya called 'Sabians', and ancient Mesopotamian religion. The cult recognized seven primary astral deities: the Sun, the Moon, and the five known planets (Jupiter, Saturn, Mercury, Venus, and Mars). Of these Jupiter and Venus were good (the Auspicious Ones), while Saturn and Mars were evil (the Nefarious Ones). The gods are all subordinated to the Sun, the supreme being. There are other gods besides the seven; the text describes the fixed stars such as Sirius as gods, and refers to the Mesopotamian god Tammuz as well as to Nasr, a pre-Islamic Arabian deity. Ibn Washiyya's description of the Tammuz ritual is particularly valuable, as it is more detailed than any other Arabic source. In this ritual, people would weep for Tammuz, who was "killed time after time in horrible ways," during the month of the same name. (Note: The practice is also mentioned in the Bible, Ezekiel 8:14: "Then he brought me to the door of the gate of the Lord's house which was toward the north; and, behold, there sat women weeping for Tammuz.") Ibn Wahshiyya also explains that the Christians of the region had a very similar practice, the Feast of Saint George, and speculates that the Christians may have adapted their custom from the Tammuz ritual.

The philosophical views of the author are similar to those of the Syrian Neoplatonist school founded by Iamblichus in the 4th century. The author believed that through the practice of esoteric rituals, one could achieve communion with God. However, the worldview of the text contains contradictions and reflects an author that is philosophically "semi-learned". One of the key philosophical passages is a treatise on the soul, in the section on vineyards, in which the author expresses doctrines very similar to those of Neoplatonism.

=== Magic ===
Why, when oak-headed snakes see pure emeralds, will they shed their eyes in less than the wink of an eye and remain eyeless? Is that caused by the primary qualities or by a special property?...What else could this be than the effects of things through their special properties? What would be the (material) cause for the effect of the special properties?

The author often describes magic in a negative light ("All the operations of the magicians are to me odious") and sometimes identifies magicians with a rival religious group, the "followers of Seth". Magic for the author consists of prayers to the gods, the creation of talismans, and manipulation of the special properties of things. These special properties depend on the configuration of the astral bodies and can produce effects such as making someone invisible or attracting goats and pigs to someone. The effects are specific to certain items, so broad beans are capable of curing "agonizing love," while ten dirhams of ground saffron mixed with wine will cause anyone who drinks it to laugh until they die. Some magical procedures rely on sympathetic magic instead of astrology, such as the technique for restoring a spring which is running dry by having young, beautiful women play music and sing near the spring. The most spectacular instance of magic is the case of a Nabataean magician who succeeded in creating an artificial man, in a story similar to the golem traditions of Kabbalistic Judaism.

=== Folklore and literature ===
They say, for example, that a farmer woke up on a moonlit night and started singing, accompanying himself on the lute. Then a big watermelon spoke to him: “You there, you and other cultivators of watermelons strive for the watermelons to be big and sweet and you tire yourselves in all different ways, yet it would be enough for you to play wind instruments and drums and sing in our midst. We are gladdened by this and we become cheerful so that our taste becomes sweet and no diseases infect us.”

The author frequently digresses from the main theme to tell folkloric tales, saying that he includes these both to instruct the reader and for entertainment, because "otherwise fatigue would blind [the reader's] soul." Many of the tales concern fantastical concepts such as talking trees or ghouls. Others are about Biblical characters or ancient kings, although the names of the kings are not those of any known historical kings, and the Biblical characters are altered from their customary forms. The tales are often related to agriculture, as when Adam teaches the Chaldeans to cultivate wheat, or King Dhanamluta plants so many water lilies in his castle that "the overabundance of water lilies around him, both their odour and their sight, caused a brain disease which proved fatal to him." There are some references to poetry, and fragments of debate poetry which are among the earliest in Arabic literature. Debate poetry is a genre in which two natural opposites such as day and night dispute their respective virtues. The examples in the text include boasts by olive trees and palm trees, and are similar in style to the Persian Drakht-i Asurig, a debate between a goat and a palm tree. At times, the stories conceal a hidden inner meaning, as in a text purporting that the eggplant will disappear for 3000 years. The author explains that this is a symbolic expression in which the 3000 years signify three months, during which eating eggplant would be unhealthy.

== Influence ==
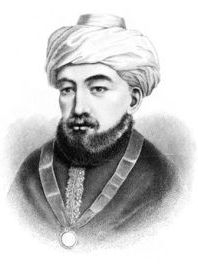
18th-century depiction of Maimonides

The Nabataean Agriculture is the most influential book on agriculture in Arabic. Dozens of writers used it as a source, from the Middle Ages until the 18th century. It was the first agronomical work to reach al-Andalus (modern Spain and Portugal), and became an important reference for the writers of the Andalusi agricultural corpus. Ibn al-Awwam in his Kitab al-filaha cited it over 540 times. Others who cited it include Jamāl al-Dīn al-Waṭwāṭ, Ibn Hajjaj, Abu l-Khayr, and al-Tighnari, and it influenced Ibn Bassal. The agricultural history of Yemen is not well known, but The Nabataean Agriculture must have reached Yemen by the era of the Rasulid dynasty, as demonstrated by quotations in the work of al-Malik al-Afdal al-Abbas (d. 1376).

The Nabataean Agriculture also had a far-reaching impact on Arabic and Latin occult literature, through the fragments quoted in the Ghayat al-hakim ("The Goal of the Wise") by the Cordoban magician, alchemist and hadith scholar Maslama al-Qurtubi (died 964), (Note: Hämeen-Anttila 2018 still follows the conventional attribution of the Ghayat al-hakim to Maslama al-Majriti (c. 950–1007). However, experts now attribute this work to Maslama al-Qurtubi: see Fierro 1996; De Callataÿ & Moureau 2017; cf. Attrell & Porreca 2019, p. 1.) an influential work on magic which was later translated into Latin under the title Picatrix.

In the 12th century Maimonides quoted The Nabataean Agriculture in his Guide for the Perplexed, as a source on pagan religion. Later translations of Maimonides into Latin mistranslated the name of the work as De agricultura Aegyptiorum ("On Egyptian Agriculture"), which caused readers such as Gottfried Wilhelm Leibniz and Samuel Purchas to refer to the book by this erroneous title. According to Ernest Renan, the book was also cited by Thomas Aquinas in the 13th century. In the 14th century, Ibn Khaldun mentioned the work in his Muqaddimah, although he believed that it had been translated from Greek.

Traces of Ibn Wahshiyya's influence also appear in Spanish literature. Alfonso X of Castile (1221–1284) commissioned a Spanish translation of an Arabic lapidary (book about gemstones) by someone named Abolays. This lapidary cites The Nabataean Agriculture (calling it The Chaldaean Agriculture), and Abolays claims, like Ibn Wahshiyya, to have translated the lapidary from an ancient language ("Chaldaean"). In the 15th century, Enrique de Villena also knew of The Nabataean Agriculture and referenced it in his Tratado del aojamiento and Tratado de lepra.

== History of modern scholarship ==
19th century

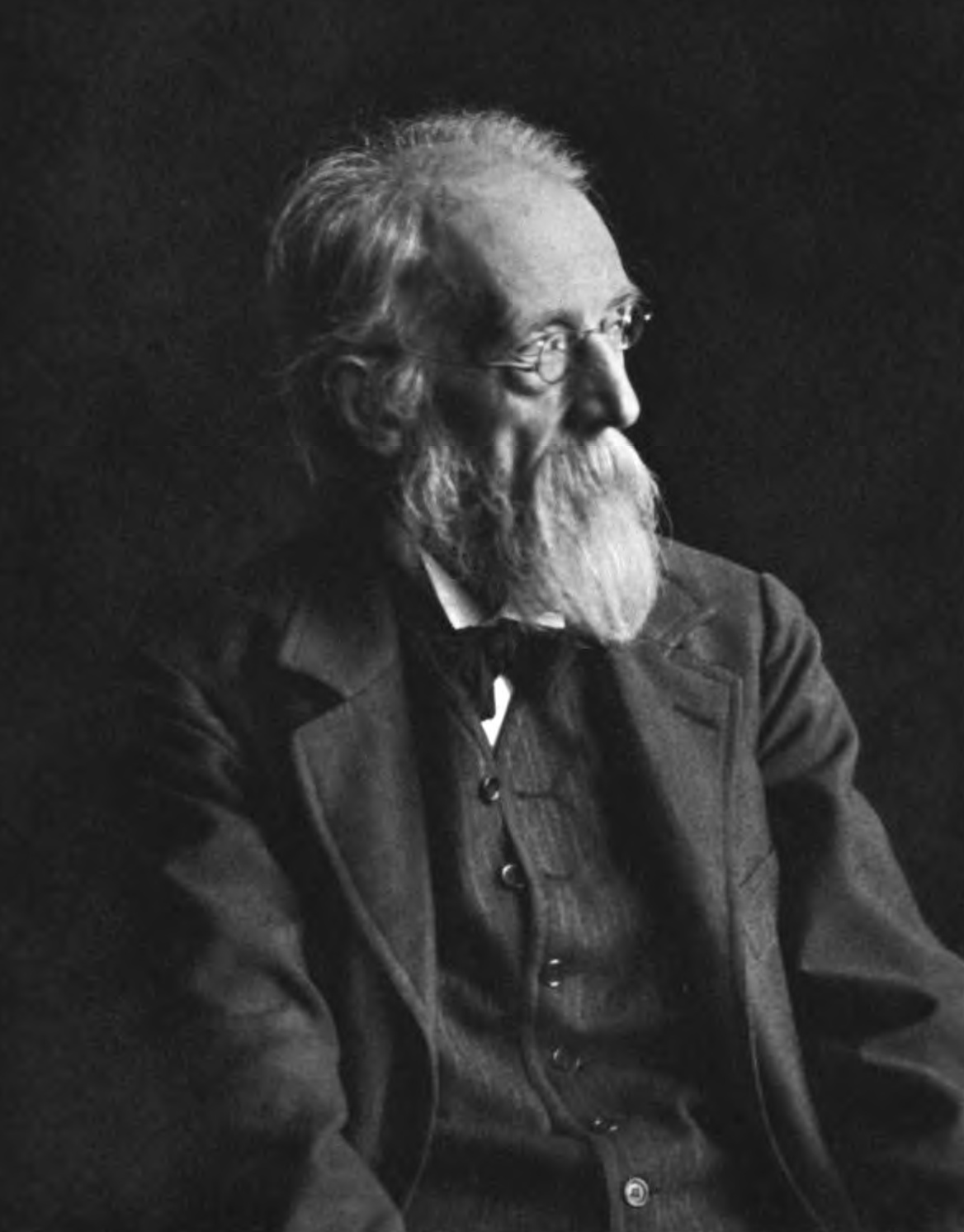
Theodor Nöldeke, a fierce critic of The Nabataean Agriculture.

The Nabataean Agriculture was first introduced to European scholarship in 1835 by the French scholar Étienne Quatremère. Daniel Chwolson popularized it in his studies of 1856 and 1859, believing that it provided authentic information about ancient Assyria and Babylonia. He dated the original text to the 14th century BC at the latest. However, his views provoked a "violent reaction" in the scholarly community, and a series of scholars set out to refute him. The first of these was Ernest Renan in 1860, who dated the work to the 3rd or 4th century. He was followed by Alfred von Gutschmid, who showed inconsistencies in the text and declared it a forgery of the Muslim era. In an article published in 1875, the eminent German scholar Theodor Nöldeke agreed with Gutschmid that the work was originally written in Arabic, going as far as to argue that Ibn Wahshiyya himself was a fiction, and that the true author was Abu Talib al-Zayyat. Nöldeke emphasized the Greek influences in the text, the author's knowledge of the calends (a feature of the Roman calendar), and his use of the solar calendar of Edessa and Harran rather than the Islamic lunar calendar. The eventual decipherment of cuneiform showed conclusively that The Nabataean Agriculture was not based on an ancient Mesopotamian source.

20th and 21st centuries

Interest in the book was slight for the first half of the 20th century. Martin Plessner was one of the few scholars to devote attention to it, in an article published in 1928. Another article was published by Ernst Bergdolt in 1932, who argued that Ibn Wahshiyya's claim to have used older sources was true. Toufic Fahd began studying the work in the late 1960s, and wrote many articles on it in which he defended the idea that the text was not a forgery by Ibn Wahshiyya, but was rather based on a pre-Islamic original. Fuat Sezgin also defended the work's authenticity as a translation from a 5th- or 6th-century work, and published a facsimile of the manuscript in 1984, while Fahd completed his critical edition of the text between 1993 and 1998. Mohammad El-Faïz supported Fahd's views and studied the work from the standpoint of Mesopotamian agriculture, publishing a monograph on the subject in 1995. Despite the fact that several scholars had now argued for the work's authenticity, Nöldeke's views still had the most currency in the early 21st century. This changed when Jaakko Hämeen-Anttila, in his monograph published in 2006, extensively argued that the work may well have been an authentic translation from the Syriac. The Nabataean Agriculture has not been translated into a European language in full, (Note: There may have been a medieval translation into Spanish, but it was lost after 1626.) but Fahd translated parts of it in to French in his articles, and Hämeen-Anttila translated other parts into English.

== See also ==
- Andalusi agricultural corpus
- Arab Agricultural Revolution
- Chaldean (disambiguation)
- History of agriculture
- History of botany
- Islam and magic

== Bibliography ==
- Attrell, Dan; Porreca, David (2019). Picatrix: A Medieval Treatise on Astral Magic. University Park: The Pennsylvania State University Press. ISBN 978-0-271-08212-7.
- Ben Maimon, M. (1956). Guide for the Perplexed. Translated by Michael Friedländer (2nd ed.). New York: Dover Publishers. pp. 315, 318, 334, 338 (part 3, chpts. 29, 37). OCLC 1031721874.
- Butzer, Karl W. (1994). "The Islamic traditions of agroecology: crosscultural experience, ideas and innovations". Ecumene. 1 (1): 7–50. doi:10.1177/147447409400100102. JSTOR 44251681. S2CID 145363850.
- Carrara, Angelo Alves (2006). "Geoponica and Nabatean Agriculture : A new approach into their sources and authorship". Arabic Sciences and Philosophy. 16 (1): 103–132. doi:10.1017/S0957423906000245. S2CID 170931904.
- Crone, Patricia; Cook, Michael (1977). Hagarism: The Making of the Islamic World. CUP Archive. ISBN 978-0-521-21133-8.
- Darby, George O. S. (1941). "Ibn Wahshiya in Mediaeval Spanish Literature". Isis. 33 (4): 433–438. doi:10.1086/358598. ISSN 0021-1753. JSTOR 330620. S2CID 143094175.
- De Callataÿ, Godefroid; Moureau, Sébastien (2017). "A Milestone in the History of Andalusī Bāṭinism: Maslama b. Qāsim al-Qurṭubī's Riḥla in the East". Intellectual History of the Islamicate World. 5 (1): 86–117. doi:10.1163/2212943X-00501004. hdl:2078.1/167526.
- El-Faïz, Muhammad (1995). L'agronomie de la Mésopotamie Antique: Analyse du 'Livre de l'Agriculture Nabatéenne' de Qutama [The Agronomy of Ancient Mesopotamia: Analysis of the 'Book of the Nabatean Agriculture' of Quthama] (in French). Leiden: Brill. ISBN 9004101993.
- Fahd, Toufic (1969). "Retour a Ibn Waḥšiyya". Arabica. 16 (1): 83–88. doi:10.1163/157005869X00225. ISSN 0570-5398. JSTOR 4055606.
- Fahd, Toufic (1970). "Conduite d'une exploitation agricole d'après 'L'Agriculture Nabatéenne'" [Running a farm according to 'The Nabataean Agriculture']. Studia Islamica (in French) (32): 109–128. doi:10.2307/1595213. ISSN 0585-5292. JSTOR 1595213.
- Fahd, Toufic (1971). "Ibn Waḥs̲h̲iyya". Encyclopaedia of Islam. Vol. III (2nd ed.). Leiden: Brill Publishers. ISBN 90-04-08118-6.
- Fahd, Toufic; Graf, D. F. (1993). "Nabaṭ". Encyclopaedia of Islam. Vol. VII (2nd ed.). Leiden: Brill Publishers. pp. 834–838. ISBN 9004094199.
- Fahd, Toufic (1996). "Botany and agriculture". In Roshdi, Rashed; Morelon, Régis (eds.). Encyclopedia of the History of Arabic Science. Vol. 3. London: Routledge. pp. 813–852. ISBN 978-0-415-12412-6.
- Fierro, Maribel (1996). "Bāṭinism in Al-Andalus. Maslama b. Qāsim al-Qurṭubī (d. 353/964), Author of the "Rutbat al-Ḥakīm" and the "Ghāyat al-Ḥakīm (Picatrix)"". Studia Islamica (84): 87–112. doi:10.2307/1595996. hdl:10261/281028. ISSN 0585-5292. JSTOR 1595996.
- Gutschmid, Alfred von (1861). "Die Nabatäische Landwirtschaft und ihre Geschwister" [The Nabataean Agriculture and its siblings]. Zeitschrift der Deutschen Morgenländischen Gesellschaft (in German). 15: 1–110.
- Hämeen-Anttila, Jaakko (1999). "Ibn Wahshiyya and magic". Anaquel de Estudios Árabes (X): 39–48.
- Hämeen-Anttila, Jaakko (2002a). "Mesopotamian National Identity in Early Arabic Sources". Wiener Zeitschrift für die Kunde des Morgenlandes. 91: 53–79. JSTOR 23863038.
- Hämeen-Anttila, Jaakko (2002b). "Continuity of Pagan Religious Traditions in Tenth-Century Iraq" (PDF). In Panaino, A.; Pettinato, G. (eds.). Ideologies as Intercultural Phenomena: Proceedings of the Third Annual Symposium of the Assyrian and Babylonian Intellectual Heritage Project. pp. 89–108.
- Hämeen-Anttila, Jaakko (2003a). "A Mesopotamian corpus: between enthusiasm and rebuttal". Studia Orientalia (97): 41–48.
- Hämeen-Anttila, Jaakko (2003b). "Artificial man and spontaneous generation in Ibn Waḥshiyya's al-Filāḥa an-Nabaṭiyya". Zeitschrift der Deutschen Morgenländischen Gesellschaft. 153 (1): 37–49. JSTOR 43381251.
- Hämeen-Anttila, Jaakko (2004). "The Oriental Tradition of Vindanius Anatolius of Berytus' "Synagōgē geōrgikōn epitēdeumatōn"". Wiener Zeitschrift für die Kunde des Morgenlandes. 94: 73–108. ISSN 0084-0076. JSTOR 23862721.
- Hämeen-Anttila, Jaakko (2006). The Last Pagans of Iraq: Ibn Waḥshiyya and His Nabatean Agriculture. Brill. ISBN 978-90-04-15010-2.
- Hämeen-Anttila, Jaakko (2018). "Ibn Waḥshiyya". Encyclopaedia of Islam. Vol. 2019–1 (3rd ed.). Brill Publishers. ISBN 9789004386624.
- Ibn Khaldun, Abd al-Rahman (1958). Muqaddimah. Translated by Rosenthal, Franz.
- Lahham, Karim (ed.). "Ibn Waḥshīyah". Filaha Texts Project.
- Mattila, Janne (2007). "Ibn Wahshiyya on the Soul: Neoplatonic Soul Doctrine and the Treatise on the Soul Contained in the Nabatean Agriculture". Studia Orientalia (101): 103–155.
- Nöldeke, Theodor (1875). "Noch Einiges über die 'nabatäische Landwirtschaft'" [Some more about the Nabataean Agriculture]. Zeitschrift der Deutschen Morgenländischen Gesellschaft (in German). 29: 445–455.
- Plessner, Martin (1928). "Der Inhalt der Nabatäischen Landwirtschaft : Ein Versuch, Ibn Wahsija zu rehabilitieren" [The Content of Nabataean Agriculture: An Attempt to Rehabilitate Ibn Wahsija]. Zeitschrift für Semitistik und verwandte Gebiete (in German). 6: 27–56.
- Quatremère, E. M. (1835). "Mémoires sur les Nabatéens". Journal Asiatique. 15: 5–55, 97–137, 209–71.
- Renan, Ernest (1862). An Essay on the Age and Antiquity of the Book of Nabathaean Agriculture. Trübuer.
- Rodgers, R. H. (1980). "Hail, Frost, and Pests in the Vineyard: Anatolius of Berytus as a Source for the Nabataean Agriculture". Journal of the American Oriental Society. 100 (1): 1–11. doi:10.2307/601382. JSTOR 601382.
- Rubin, Milka (1998). "The Language of Creation or the Primordial Language: A Case of Cultural Polemics in Antiquity" (PDF). Journal of Jewish Studies. 49 (2): 306–333. doi:10.18647/2120/JJS-1998.
- Sezgin, Fuat (1971). Geschichte des arabischen Schrifttums, Band IV: Alchimie, Chemie, Botanik, Agrikultur bis ca. 430 H. Leiden: Brill. ISBN 9789004020092.
- al-Shihabi, Mustafa (1965). "Filāḥa". Encyclopaedia of Islam. Vol. II (2nd ed.). Brill Publishers. ISBN 90-04-07026-5.
- Stroumsa, Guy G. (2001). "John Spencer and the Roots of Idolatry". History of Religions. 41 (1): 1–23. doi:10.1086/463657. ISSN 0018-2710. JSTOR 3176496. S2CID 161756502.
- Varisco, Daniel Martin (1997). "Review of 'L'Agriculture nabateenne: Traduction en arabe attribuee a Abu Bakr Ahmad b. Ali al-Kasdani connu sous le nom d'lbn Wahsiyya'". The Journal of the American Oriental Society. 117 (2). doi:10.2307/605523. JSTOR 605523.
- Varisco, Daniel Martin (2011). "Medieval Agricultural Texts from Rasulid Yemen". Filaha Texts Project.

== Editions ==
- Fahd, Toufic (ed.). L'Agriculture nabatéenne: Traduction en arabe attribuée à Abu Bakr Ahmad b. Ali al-Kasdani connue sous le nom d'lbn Wahshiyya. Damascus: al-Ma‘had al-‘Ilmī al-Faransī lil-Dirāsāt al-‘Arabīyah. (3 vols., 1993–1998.)
