= Andalusi agricultural corpus =

The Andalusi agricultural corpus are texts of agronomic knowledge and sources for the history of agriculture in the Andalusi Iberian Peninsula. Agronomic advancement had deteriorated under Visigothic rule, but there are eight known agricultural treatises dating from the late 10th century to the mid 14th century, contributing to the Arab Agricultural Revolution. The Andalusi treatises follow the same pattern as Latin agronomic texts: a discussion of soil, water and manure followed by crop science, and sometimes notes on animal husbandry. Six of these are written between the 11th and 13th centuries.

The authors of this body of texts are Ibn al-Wafid, Ibn Hajjaj, Ibn Bassal, Abū l-Khayr, Ibn al-'Awwam, Al-Tighnari and Ibn Luyun.

== Background ==
Muslims from North Africa crossed the Strait of Gibraltar in 711 and established the Caliphate of Córdoba in the southern part of the Iberian peninsula, which they called Al-Andalus. During their long reign of prosperity, the Muslims created a culture that favored the proliferation of cultural and scientific works, including agronomic works. The Byzantine emperor Constantine VII sent a copy of Dioscorides' pharmacopeia to Caliph Abd al-Rahman III, and also sent a monk named Nicolas to translate the book into Arabic.

The first Andalusi botanical garden known from 8th century sources was created in the Palace Al-Munyat al-Rusafa (Arruzafa) of Abd al-Rahman I.

== Texts ==
The Arabic language agricultural corpus were composed between the 11th and 14th century in Seville, Toledo, Granada and Córdoba. Abū l-Khayr's botanical work is the most complete Andalusi botanical text known to modern scholars, containing richer descriptions of plant morphology than other agronomy texts, and detailed information about habitat, plant phenology, uses, cultivars and geographical distribution.

Ibn al-Awamm's Kitab al Filaha is considered the most important and encyclopedic of the medieval writings from the European west, but it was relatively unknown in Northwestern Europe until the 19th century when it was first translated into French and Spanish. It contains details on plants like "All plants planted in [the walnut's] vicinity show antipathy to it, with the exception of the fig". He quotes extensively from the Nabatean Agriculture, and to a lesser extent from earlier Roman and Andalusi authors.

These texts were mostly based on Columella's earlier work De re rustica. But they were also influenced by earlier peasant knowledge and contained details about the agricultural practices of al-Andalus, many of which came from the palace gardens or nearby agricultural areas. As such they contain details about Umayyad Córdoba's aristocratic gardens.

There is some information of how new species like the Syrian pomegranate were adapted to Al-Andalus. The Syrian pomegranate was brought to Al-Andalus by a returning ambassador where it was planted in Bunila (modern day Casarabonela) in 780 AD.

== Ornamentals ==
The taxonomy criteria of these medieval texts is different than what is used today. Plants with similar external appearance usually fall under the same species name, though in modern taxonomy they are considered different. Many plants were cultivated as ornamentals, but agricultural treatises don't clearly differentiate between decorative plants in gardens and plants with other uses sown in fields and orchards. Ibn Luyun, following al-Tighnari, devotes several chapters to alimentary seeds with culinary uses as spices or vegetables, followed by a section on plants that he describes as maslayat, which carries connotations of amusement or peacefulness. Ibn Luyun says there are some plants cultivated for tasliya (delight) primarily for their scent or visual appearance, or as ornamentation (li-l-zina) planted in the domestic gardens (basatin).

Ibn Luyun is exception, and most treatises classify species based on morphological qualities like aroma, and the color and shape of flowers.

Pinus pinea (Sanawbar) was planted along walls to create a more beautiful appearance and placed at the center of a pool to provide shade. Cupressus sempervirens, (Sarw, sarwal) - was also a decorative plant used along garden walls for appearance, near the gate, pool, and along paths and angles. (Decorative cypress trees are still a common feature of Mediterranean gardens in modern times.)

Colocasia esclulenta, (Qulqas) was planted next to water sources and ponds for its appearance. Lilium candidum was grown as ponds for its aroma and beautiful appearance. Crocus sativus, (Za 'faran) was noted by Andalusi writers for its aromatic quality. Many species of narjis (narcissus) are identified, and yellow narcissus is noted for its appearance and aroma, but not all are considered valuable as ornamental plants. Of the many species of Nymphaeaceae (Nilufar), al-'Awwam mostly discusses the white water lily (nilufar abyad).
