= Tighnari =

Tighnari may refer to:

- al-Tighnari (died 1118), Andalusi botanist
- Tighnari, character from Genshin Impact
