= Al-Tighnari =

Andalusian agronomist (fl. 1075–1118)

- الطغنري
- Born: Abu Abdullah Muhammad ibn Malik al-Murri al-Tighnari al-Gharnati; Tignar, Granada, Al-Andalus
- Known for: Zuhrat al-Bustan wa-Nuzhat al-Adhhan
- Scientific career
- Fields: Botany, Agronomy, Poetry

Pronunciation of al-Tighnari in Arabic

Al-Tighnari (Arabic: الطغنري, romanized: al-Ṭighnarī; in full Abu Abdullah Muhammad ibn Malik al-Murri al-Tighnari al-Gharnati; (Note: In Arabic, أبو عبد الله محمد بن مالك المري الطغنري الغرناطي. Sources differ over how much of the name to give. Ibn al-Khatib, the earliest to record it, has محمد بن مالك المري الطغنري, without the kunya or the final element; the Encyclopaedia of Islam heads its entry Abū ʽAbd Allāh Muḥammad b. Mālik al-Murrī; the Real Academia de la Historia gives al-Ḥāŷŷ al-Garnāṭī in place of al-Ṭignarī. Al-Tighnari, meaning "from Tignar", is a geographical nisba taken from the village where he was born, and is the name by which he became best known.) fl. 1075–1118) was an Arab Muslim agronomist, botanist, poet and traveler from Al-Andalus, who may also have been a physician. He wrote a treatise on agronomy, Zuhrat al-Bustan wa-Nuzhat al-Adhhan (Arabic: زهرة البستان ونزهة الأذهان, lit. 'The Glory of the Garden and Recreation of the Minds'), which he dedicated to the Almoravid governor of Granada.

Before writing it he traveled through al-Andalus and North Africa to Egypt and the Levant, and probably performed the Hajj. The treatise records what he observed at each stop, and he meant to apply the farming and irrigation methods he saw there to conditions in al-Andalus. Only part of it survives: the original manuscript, in Algiers, runs to less than half the work. Expiración García Sánchez considers it the most systematic of the Andalusian treatises on agriculture, while Karl Butzer judged it narrower in scope than was usual for the genre.

== Biography ==
Al-Tighnari was born into an Arab family of Banu Murra, in the now-vanished village of Tignar, (Note: Only the ruins of an old farmhouse survive, in the pago of Tina in the municipality of Albolote. A street in the village leading to the site is still called Tinar.) in the province of Granada, Al-Andalus (now Spain). Expiración García Sánchez places Tignar in the Vega of Granada between the present-day Albolote and Maracena, though she notes that Ibn al-Khatib records two places of that name and that her conclusions are not definitive. He is also called al-Hajj al-Gharnati. Several manuscripts of his treatise are attributed to a Hamdun al-Ishbili, otherwise unknown, and Carl Brockelmann, following earlier biographers, identified al-Tighnari with him. The exact years of his birth and death are unknown, though he was born in the second half of the 11th century and was alive between 1075 and 1118.

Al-Tighnari was a man of letters and a poet, and lived under the Zirid ruler Abdallah ibn Buluggin. Ibn al-Khatib gives him the title of vizier. García Sánchez notes that by the 11th century the word covered courtiers and poets generally, so the title says nothing about political office. He was one of many Granadan figures who moved to the Taifa of Almería, probably because of disagreements with the ruler. He was part of a group of poets and scientists at the royal court of the Banu Sumadih. He carried out agricultural experiments in the gardens of the royal residence, al-Sumadihiyya. He also spent time at the Hammadid court at Qal'at Bani Hammad in North Africa, where 'Izz al-Dawla, son of al-Mu'tasim ibn Sumadih, had taken refuge ahead of the Almoravid occupation of Almería. His treatise records agricultural practices he saw there.

Al-Tighnari moved to Seville after the Almoravids conquered Granada. There he joined a circle of poets and naturalists at the Sevillian court who studied under shared masters, among them the Toledo agronomist Ibn Bassal and the Sevillian physician Abu l-Hasan Sihab. By his own account he was studying in Seville under Abu l-Hasan Sihab in 1100, and possibly also under Ibn al-Lunquh, or Ibn Luengo, a physician from Toledo and a disciple of Ibn Bassal.

Al-Tighnari then traveled through al-Andalus, North Africa and the East, making contact with the intellectual centers along his route. After staying at Qal'at Bani Hammad he went on through the eastern Mediterranean, through Tripoli, Alexandria and several Syrian cities, Damascus among them. He studied the farming and irrigation methods he found in each place, meaning to put them to use in al-Andalus. Ibn al-'Awwam's treatise on agronomy calls him al-Hajj al-Gharnati, so he probably made the Hajj at some point. He returned to al-Andalus afterwards and lived alternately in Granada and Seville. He wrote his treatise on agronomy for the Almoravid prince Tamim, son of Yusuf ibn Tashfin, who was then governor of Granada.

Expiración García Sánchez describes him as a "fine writer" with a terse, spare style. Only fragments of his poetry and prose survive, but she considers them enough to judge his ability. She suggests he may also have practiced medicine, given the detailed medical knowledge in the treatise, though no evidence confirms that he did. He is said to have served as physician first to Abdallah ibn Buluggin and later to Tamim. García Sánchez considers the second possible but undocumented, and rules out the first, since Abdallah's own memoirs never mention him.

Ibn Bassam and Ibn al-Khatib both quote verses of his poetry. Of the surviving fragments Ibn Bassam wrote: "I have found nothing recorded of this man beyond a few verses of his poetry and two passages of his prose; but a tree is known by a single fruit. Slight as it is, one can tell that he was a leading man of letters, of retentive memory and abundant learning." (Note: The Arabic reads لم أقف من ذكر هذا الرجل إلا على أبيات من شعره، وفصلين من نثره، ويستدل على الشجر بالواحدة من الثمر، ومع قلته فإنه يعرف أنه صدرٌ أديب، ذو حفظ كثير، وأدب غزير. García Sánchez renders the proverb in the middle of the passage as "para conocer la calidad de un árbol, con uno solo de sus frutos basta", citing Ibn Bassam, Dhakhira, i/2, p. 805.)

An Arabic account states that al-Tighnari died in Granada and was buried there, though García Sánchez holds that neither the date nor the place of his death is known. He asked for these lines to be written on his tomb:

O my friend, turn aside at my grave, and you will find,
between the sides of a tomb, one whom the earth has eaten.
Faint is my voice, should I speak; yet what utterance,
if you take the lesson, is more eloquent than this?
My eyes have beheld wonders, and yet
death has parted my body from my soul.

(Note: The Arabic reads يا خليلي، عرّج على قبري تجد أكلة التّرب بين جنبي ضريح / خافت الصوت إن نطقت ولكن أيّ نطق إن اعتبرت فصيح / أبصرت عينيّ العجائب لكن فرّق الموت بين جسمي وروحي, following Ibn al-Khatib. The English is a translation of that text.)

== Major work on agronomy ==
Al-Tighnari wrote his work on agronomy, Zuhrat al-Bustan wa-Nuzhat al-Adhhan (Arabic: زهرة البستان ونزهة الأذهان, lit. 'The Glory of the Garden and Recreation of the Minds'), in the years around 1100. The date is not settled: García Sánchez has placed the writing between 1107 and 1110, and later, on the evidence of marginal notes in the manuscript of Ibn Luyun's treatise, between 1096 and 1107, while her Encyclopaedia of Islam entry gives about 1110. Tamim held the governorship from 1107 to 1110 and again from 1121 to 1126. It was dedicated to the Almoravid governor of Granada, Abu Tahir Tamim ibn Yusuf ibn Tashfin. The original survives only as an incomplete unicum in the National Library of Algeria (no. 2163). It runs to some 60 folios, less than half the work. According to Ibn Luyun, who owned a copy, it ran to 12 books (maqalat) and 360 chapters (abwab). Eleven copies of an abridgement also survive, and these supply the first part, which the original lacks. Its contents largely resemble other Andalusian works on agriculture. More than three of the closing books are absent from every manuscript. They may have covered animal husbandry, as in the treatises of Ibn al-'Awwam and Ibn al-Wafid, though that is not certain.

The book is a systematic guide to agronomy. It opens with an astronomical and meteorological calendar, carries linguistic, toponymic and botanical detail throughout, and closes each entry on a plant or tree with an account of its properties, beneficial and harmful, from a therapeutic and dietary point of view.

He begins with soils, fertilizers and hydrology, then turns to practical advice on running a household, then to plant growth: planting, sowing, grafting, plant diseases and other agricultural tasks.

The book also describes the fertile plain of Granada and the cold high plateaus bordering it, where wheat and other cereals were grown. On the coastal strip from Almeria to Málaga it records techniques close to those used today for sugarcane and some citrus crops.

=== Travels in the Middle East ===
Al-Tighnari recorded his journey at several points in the treatise, naming the city of Salé in Morocco and Qal'at Bani Hammad in Algeria before heading east to Egypt, and perhaps on from there to the Hejaz for the Hajj. Writing on agriculture (al-Hina'), he noted the height trees reached in Egypt: "I saw it in the land of Egypt, and in the land of the Levant, which was planted 25 years ago, and the trees grew on the legs of a man like the son of Adam".

In the Levant he visited Ashkelon in Palestine, where he described the well-known Abraham's Well and witnessed how such wells were dug and their columns erected. Damascus appears more than once. On the cultivation of fennel he wrote: "And I saw fennel in Damascus, Syria, in the shape of a red leaf, and I did not see it anywhere else." At Aleppo he recorded what was planted there and the methods of agriculture used, noting of cotton: "And I saw it in Aleppo for a period of 30 years and more".

=== Sources and assessment ===
On the sinking of wells and the location of underground water, García Sánchez regards al-Tighnari as one of the most original of the Andalusian authors. He follows the techniques described in The Nabataean Agriculture closely, but not the theosophical material that book develops alongside them; in his treatise the magical element is reformed and merged with the rational. He also gives accounts of his own experience, at times contrasting it with techniques he learned on his journeys through Syria and Tunisia.

Al-Tighnari cites his sources heavily but does not simply reproduce them: he sifts them and tests them against practical experience. They are abundant and, unlike those of most Andalusian agronomists, almost all identifiable. They include Ptolemy, Hippocrates, Galen, Dioscorides, al-Kindi, Hunayn ibn Ishaq, Ibn Wahshiyya and Abu Bakr al-Razi, along with the Greek compilers Bolus of Mendes and Cassianus Bassus. Among Andalusian agronomists he names only Ibn al-Wafid and Ibn Bassal. He was in turn used as a source by later authors, among them Ibn al-'Awwam and Ibn Luyun.

García Sánchez considers the treatise probably the most systematic of the Andalusian works on agriculture, and on many points more detailed and precise than the others. She calls it both highly original and a "specifically Andalusian text", for the local material it carries on agricultural practice and on the plants found across the regions of al-Andalus. Karl Butzer takes a more reserved view of its scope: judging by the 68 citations of al-Tighnari in Ibn al-'Awwam, he considers the treatise less comprehensive than was usual for the genre, with little or nothing on vegetables and condiments.

== In popular culture ==
Tighnari, a character introduced in the Genshin Impact Sumeru update in 2022, is named after al-Tighnari. In a study of how the game represents Middle Eastern culture, Sularjo and colleagues observe that both are botanists with an interest in agriculture. They add that the name also comes from Tamazight, the language of the Amazigh. The character's costume mixes an Algerian belt, a Moroccan djellaba, an Amazigh burnous and Persian salwar trousers, and his ears and tail are those of a fennec fox.
