= Ibn al-'Awwam =

Andalusian writer

Ibn al-'Awwam (Arabic: ابن العوام), also called Abu Zakariya Ibn al-Awwam (Arabic: أبو زكريا بن العوام), was an Andalusi agriculturist who flourished at Seville (modern-day southern Spain) in the later 12th century. He wrote a lengthy handbook on agriculture entitled in Arabic Kitāb al-Filāḥa (Arabic: كِتَاب الفِلَاحَة, lit. ''Book on Agriculture''), which is the most comprehensive treatment of the subject in medieval Arabic, and one of the most important medieval works on the subject in any language. It was published in Spanish and French translations in the 19th century.

== Biography ==
His full name was Abu Zakariya Yahya ibn Muhammad ibn Ahmad ibn Al-'Awwam Al-Ishbili (Arabic: أبو زكريا يحيى بن محمد بن أحمد بن العوام الإشبيلي). The appellation "Al-Ishbili" at the end of his name means "the Sevillean" i.e. from Seville. Nearly everything that is known about him is gleaned from his book. It appears that he was a large landowner whose interests lay exclusively with agricultural matters. It is clear that he did much hands-on growing and experimenting with a wide range of crops himself. It is also clear that he was well-read in the agricultural writings of his predecessors.

== Kitāb al-Filāḥa (كتاب الفلاحة) ==
The work is mostly compiled from the writings of other authors. Al-'Awwam cites information from 112 different prior authors. His citations of earlier authors have been analyzed with the following summary results: about 1,900 direct and indirect citations altogether, of which 615 are to Greek authors (the great majority to the Geoponica of Cassianus Bassus), 585 are to Middle Eastern Arabic authors (the great majority to the Book of Nabataean Agriculture attributed to Ibn Wahshiyya), and 690 are to Andalusian Arabic authors (the great majority to Ibn Bassal, Abu ʾl-Khayr al-Ishbīlī or Ibn Hajjaj, all three of whom wrote books about agriculture in the later 11th century in southern Spain, copies of which have survived only partly and incompletely). Ibn al-Awwam compiled from only a subset of the authors he cites: This subset in turn contains all the material of the full set of authors he cites. His most influential direct sources were the Andalusian Arabic sources, who in turn were acquainted with various non-Andalusian sources, including sources from classical antiquity. Like himself, his Andalusian sources had read the Geoponica and the Nabataean Agriculture.

Ibn al-Awwam's book is divided into thirty-four chapters. The first thirty deal with crops and the last four deal with livestock. The first four chapters in the book deal successively with different types of soils, fertilizers, irrigation, and planning a garden layout. Then there are five chapters on growing fruit trees, including grafting, pruning, growing from cuttings, etc., and dozens of different fruit trees are treated individually. Later chapters deal with ploughing, the choice of seeds, the seasons and their tasks, grain farming, leguminous plants, small allotments, aromatic plants and industrial plants. Again, many plants are treated individually on how to cultivate them. One chapter is devoted to methods of preserving and storing foods after harvest, a topic which comes up intermittently elsewhere. The symptoms of many diseases of trees and vines are indicated, as are methods of cure. The chapters on livestock include discussion of the diseases and injuries to horses and cattle.

Ibn al-Awwam's book, an agriculture encyclopedia of more than a thousand pages, is primarily a compilation of the writings of other authors. But it is a compilation that is guided and informed by Ibn al-Awwam's own rich and non-bookish knowledge of the subject.

An edition was published in 1802 with the Arabic text placed alongside a translation into Spanish. In 1864, it was published in French.

== See also ==
- Arab Agricultural Revolution
