= Abu'l-Khayr al-Ishbili =

11th century Andalusī agronomist and author

- Born: Seville
- Occupation: agronomist

Abu ʾl-Khayr al-Ishbīlī (Arabic: أبو الخير الإشبيلي, fl. 11th century), called al-Shajjār ('the arboriculturist'), was an Andalusī agronomist and the author of two Arabic works on agriculture and botany. Little is known of his life. He was born in Seville and lived during the reign of the Emir al-Muʿtamid (1069–1091), in whose gardens he probably worked. He was a student of Ibn Baṣṣāl and Ibn al-Lūnquh.

The two works attributed to Abu ʾl-Khayr are:

- Kitāb al-filāḥa ("Book of Husbandry"), a treatise on agriculture. It is found in at least three manuscripts in Paris, Rabat and Tetuan. In addition, the Arabic text has been published, as have partial French and complete Spanish translations.
- Umdat al-ṭabīb fī ma‘rifat al-nabāt li-kull labīb ("The Physician's Reliance in the Knowledge of Plants for Every Man of Understanding"), an encyclopedia of botanical knowledge. This work is anonymous and traditionally ascribed to the "Anonymous Botanist of Seville", but arguments that it is the work of Abu ʾl-Khayr have been accepted by its most recent editors (2004).

== Bibliography ==
- Bustamante Costa, Joaquín; Corriente, Federico; Tilmatine, Mohand, eds. (2004). Umdat al-ṭabīb fī ma‘rifat al-nabāt li-kull labīb (Libro base del médico para el conocimiento de la botánica por todo experto). Consejo Superior de Investigaciones Científicas.
- Lahham, Karim, ed. (n.d.). "Abū ʾl-Khayr: Kitāb al-filāḥa". The Filāḥa Texts Project: The Arabic Books of Husbandy.
- Pérès, Henri (1960). "Abu ʾl-Khayr al-Ishbīlī". In Gibb, H. A. R.; Kramers, J. H.; Lévi-Provençal, E.; Schacht, J.; Lewis, B. & Pellat, Ch. (eds.). The Encyclopaedia of Islam, Second Edition. Volume I: A–B. Leiden: E. J. Brill. pp. 135–136. OCLC 495469456.
