= Picatrix =

Medieval book on magic and astrology

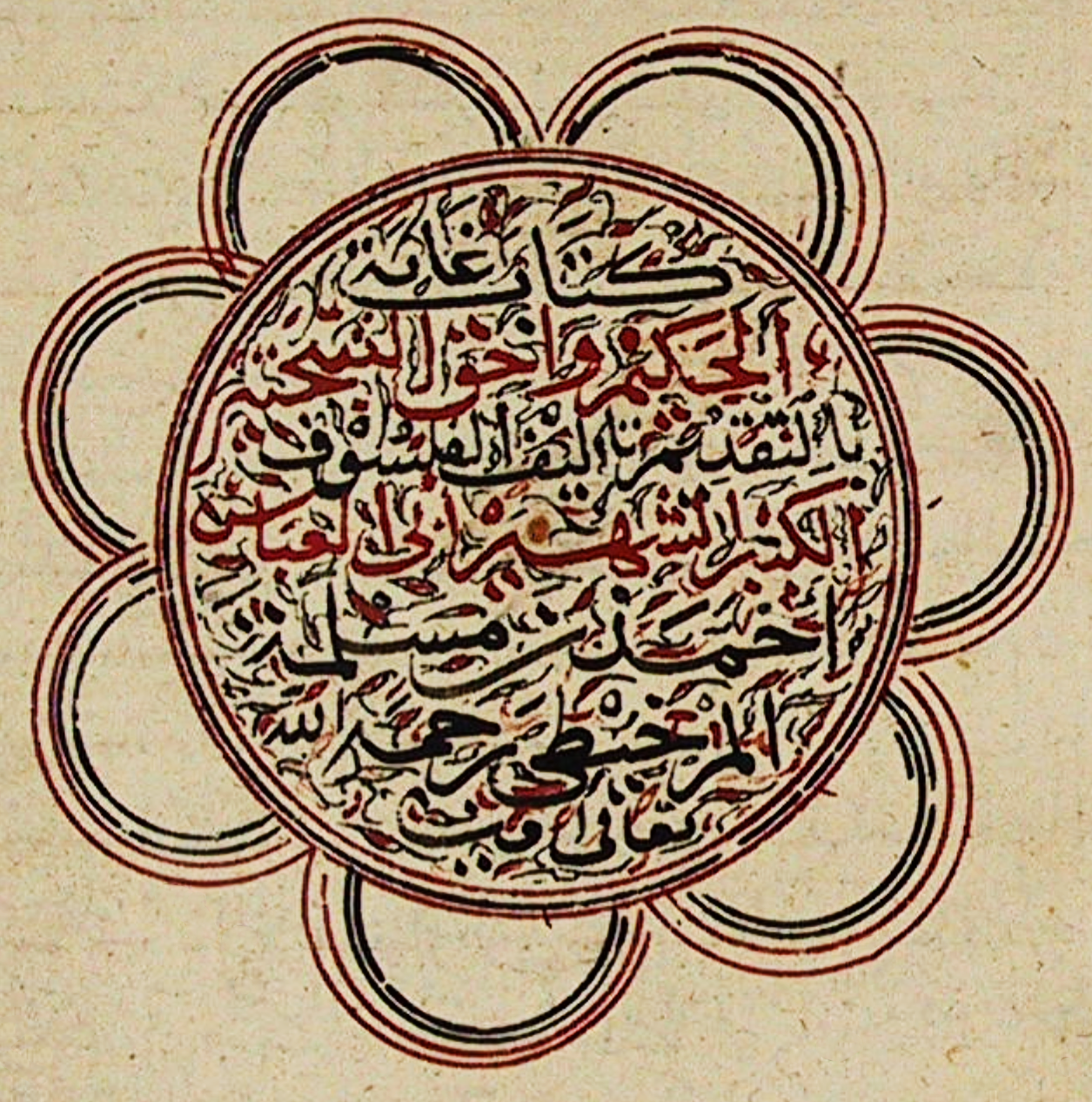
Title of a 1612 Ghayat al-Hakim manuscript (Istanbul, Hagia Sophia 2443).

Picatrix (Arabic: غاية الحكيم, romanized: Ghāyat al-Ḥakīm or Ghayat al-hakim wa-ahaqq al-natijatayn bi-altaqdim lit. 'The Aim of the Sage' or 'The Goal of The Wise' (Note: The Arabic word (ghaya, pl. ghayat) translates to "goal", while also suggests the sense of "utmost limit" or "boundary".)) is a 400-page Arabic book of magic and astrology, which most scholars assume was originally written in the middle of the 11th century, though an argument for composition in the first half of the 10th century has been made. The work was translated into Spanish and then into Latin during the 13th century, at which time it got the Latin title Picatrix. The title Picatrix is also sometimes used to refer to the book's author.

Picatrix is a composite work that synthesizes older works on magic and astrology. One of the most influential interpretations suggests it is to be regarded as a "handbook of talismanic magic". Another researcher summarizes it as "the most thorough exposition of celestial magic in Arabic", indicating the sources for the work as "Arabic texts on Hermeticism, Sabianism, Ismailism, astrology, alchemy and magic produced in the Near East in the ninth and tenth centuries A.D." Eugenio Garin declares, "In reality the Latin version of the Picatrix is as indispensable as the Corpus Hermeticum or the writings of Albumasar for understanding a conspicuous part of the production of the Renaissance, including the figurative arts." It has significantly influenced West European esotericism from Marsilio Ficino in the 15th century, to Thomas Campanella in the 17th century. The manuscript in the British Library passed through several hands: Simon Forman, Richard Napier, Elias Ashmole and William Lilly.

According to the prologue of the Latin translation, Picatrix was translated into Spanish from the Arabic by order of Alphonso X of Castile at some time between 1256 and 1258. The Latin version was produced sometime later, based on translation of the Spanish manuscripts. It has been attributed to Maslama ibn Ahmad al-Majriti (an Andalusian mathematician), but many have called this attribution into question. Consequently, the author is sometimes indicated as "Pseudo-Majriti".

The Spanish and Latin versions were the only ones known to Western scholars until Wilhelm Printz discovered an Arabic version in or around 1920.

== Content and sources ==
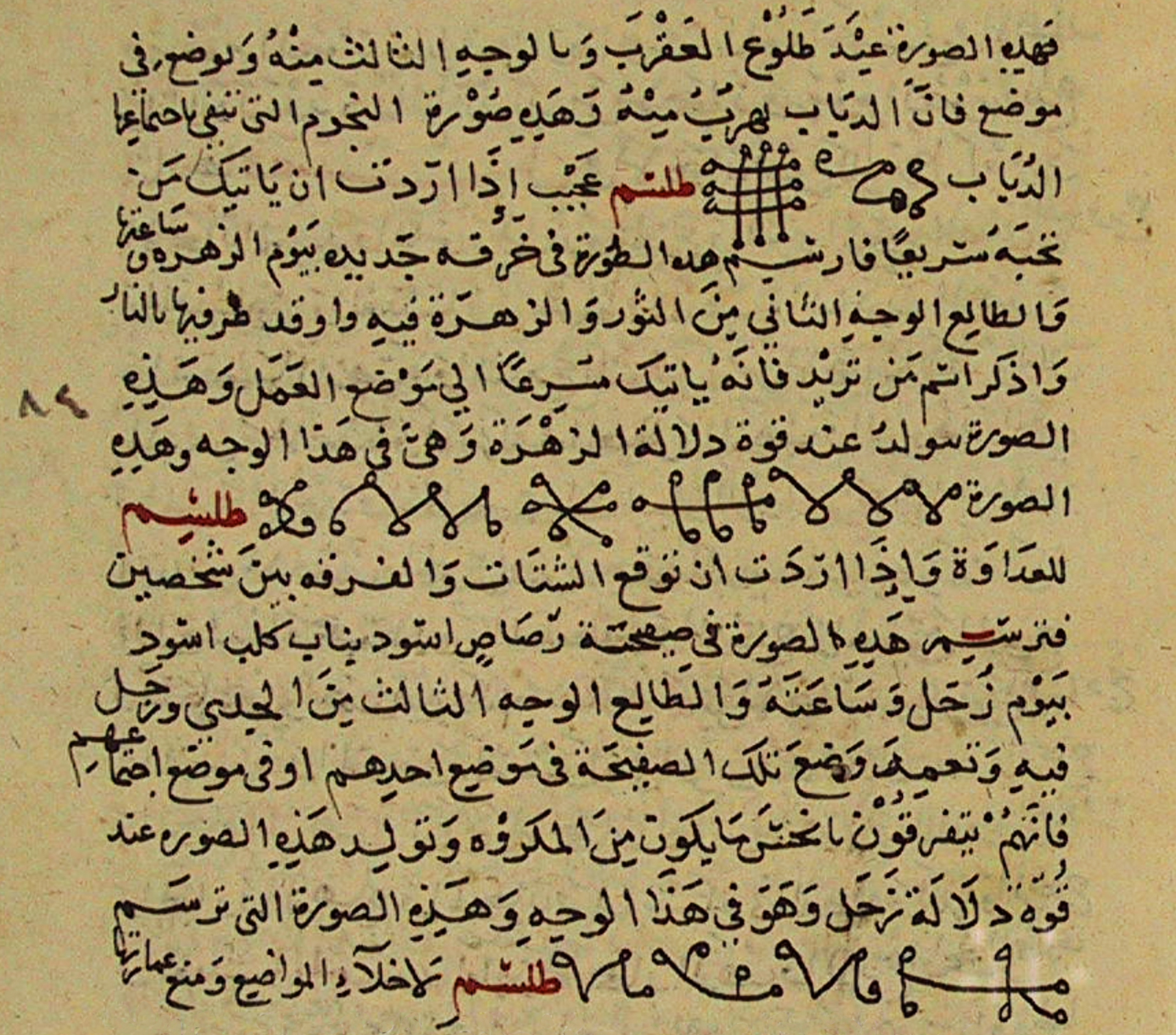
Instructions for a talisman against flies, a love-talisman, and an enmity-talisman. (Istanbul, Hagia Sophia 2443).

The work is divided into four books, which exhibit a marked absence of systematic exposition. Jean Seznec observed, "Picatrix prescribes propitious times and places and the attitude and gestures of the suppliant; he also indicates what terms must be used in petitioning the stars." As an example, Seznec then reproduces a prayer to Saturn from the work, noting that Fritz Saxl has pointed out that this invocation exhibits "the accent and even the very terms of a Greek astrological prayer to Kronos. This is one indication that the sources of Picatrix are in large part Hellenistic.":

O Master of sublime name and great power, supreme Master; O Master Saturn: Thou, the Cold, the Sterile, the Mournful, the Pernicious; Thou, whose life is sincere and whose word sure; Thou, the Sage and Solitary, the Impenetrable; Thou, whose promises are kept; Thou who art weak and weary; Thou who hast cares greater than any other, who knowest neither pleasure nor joy; Thou, the old and cunning, master of all artifice, deceitful, wise, and judicious; Thou who bringest prosperity or ruin, and makest men to be happy or unhappy! I conjure thee, O Supreme Father, by Thy great benevolence and Thy generous bounty, to do for me what I ask [...]

According to Garin:

The work's point of departure is the unity of reality divided into symmetrical and corresponding degrees, planes or worlds: a reality stretched between two poles: the original One, God the source of all existence, and man, the microcosm, who, with his science (scientia) brings the dispersion back to its origin, identifying and using their correspondences.

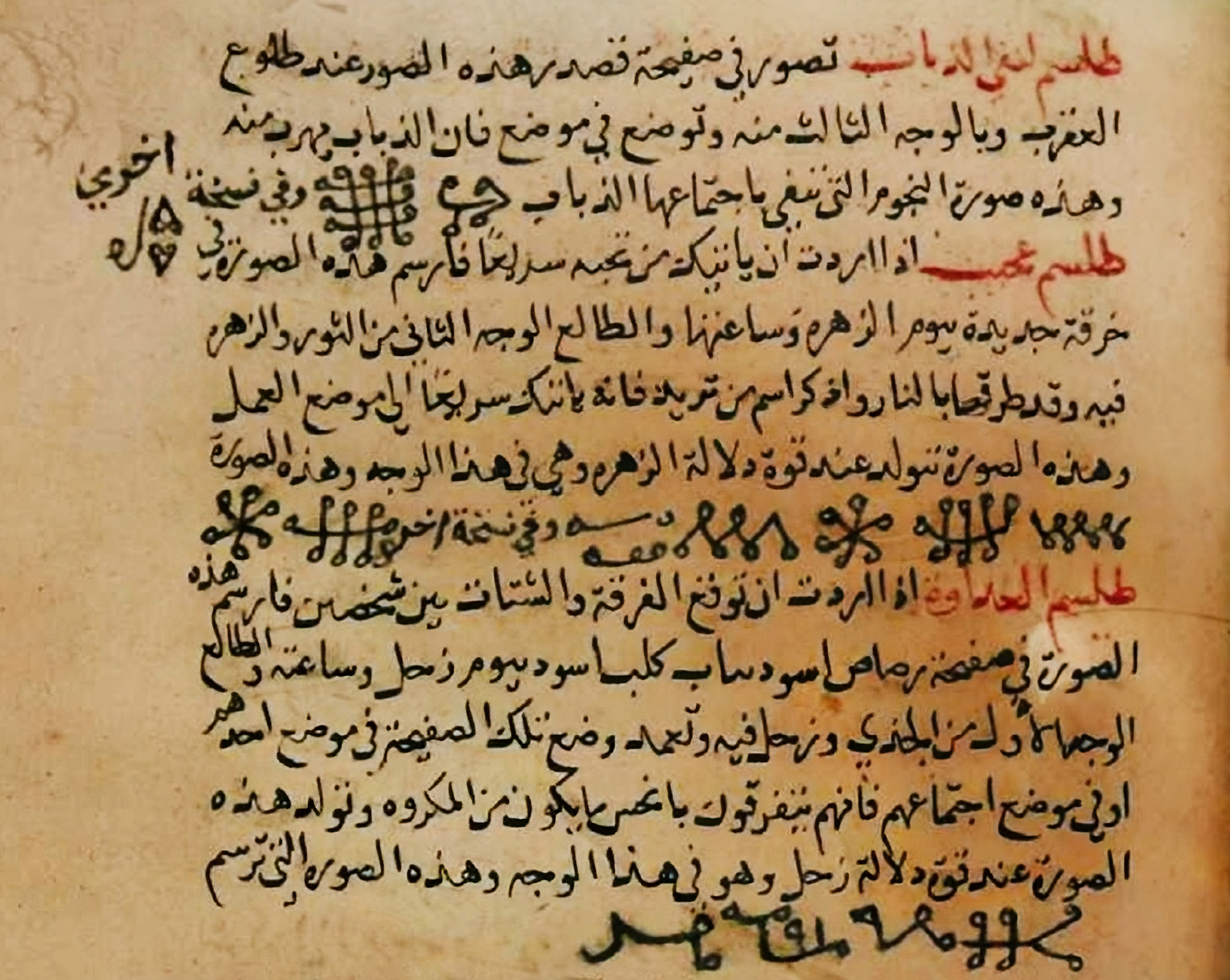
Same section in a different 18th century manuscript (Riyadh, KSU MS 5751).

According to the Prologue, the author researched over two hundred works in the creation of Picatrix. However, there are three significant Near/Middle Eastern influences: Jabir ibn Hayyan, the Brethren of Purity, and ibn Wahshiyya's Nabataean Agriculture. The influence of Jabir ibn Hayyan comes in the form of a cosmological background that removes magical practices from the context of diabolical influences and reasserts these practices as having a divine origin. The author of Picatrix utilizes Neoplatonic theories of hypostasis that mirror the work of Jabir ibn Hayyan.

The lunar mansions (mansiones Lunae) constitute one of the central organizing principles of the Picatrix, underpinning much of its electional astrology, talismanic image magic, and ritual operations. Throughout the work, the Moon’s passage through the twenty-eight mansions determines the timing, construction, and intended effects of magical images, suffumigations, and planetary rituals. The Latin text devotes substantial attention to the virtues of the lunar mansions, including an entire chapter on “the properties and compositions of the heavens for making images in the twenty-eight mansions of the Moon” (De generibus, proprietatibus et compositionibus caeli ad faciendum imagines in XXVIII mansionibus Lunae), followed by numerous practical operations organized according to the mansions.

The Picatrix also repeatedly presents the Indians (Hindus) as authoritative custodians of important branches of magical knowledge. In Book II, Chapter 5 (“The division of this science among nations, and which part of it each nation possesses”), the text explicitly states that “the Hindus are most versed in this last science” and further emphasizes that “the Hindus have their strength and power through words,” before describing Indian traditions of sacred speech, enchantment, and magical practice in considerable detail. Elsewhere, the work repeatedly attributes the knowledge of the lunar mansions and their magical virtues to Indian authorities (Nakshatra), treating Indian astrological doctrine as one of the principal sources from which this aspect of astral magic was derived. While modern scholarship generally understands the medieval lunar mansion tradition as the product of interaction between Indian, Persian, and Arabic astrological traditions, the Picatrix itself consistently presents Indian learning as a foundational authority for both mansion lore and several other branches of celestial magic.

While tracing the correlates for the Kabbalistic notion of the astral body (Hebrew: tselem), Gershom Scholem cited its occurrence in the Picatrix, and pointed out the background of this concept in Greek papyri and philosophical texts, in Gnostic texts, in Iranian eschatology, and in Islamic and Renaissance Neoplatonism. Scholem also specifically noted Henry Corbin's work in documenting the concept of the perfected nature in Iranian and Islamic religion.

According to Scholem, the following passage from the Picatrix (itself similar to a passage in an earlier Hermetic text called the Secret of Creation) tracks very closely with the Kabbalistic concept of tselem:

When I wished to find knowledge of the secrets of Creation, I came upon a dark vault within the depths of the earth, filled with blowing winds. ... Then there appeared to me in my sleep a shape of most wondrous beauty [giving me instructions how to conduct myself in order to attain knowledge of the highest things]. I then said to him: "Who are you?" And he answered: "I am your perfected nature."

== Authorship and significance of title ==
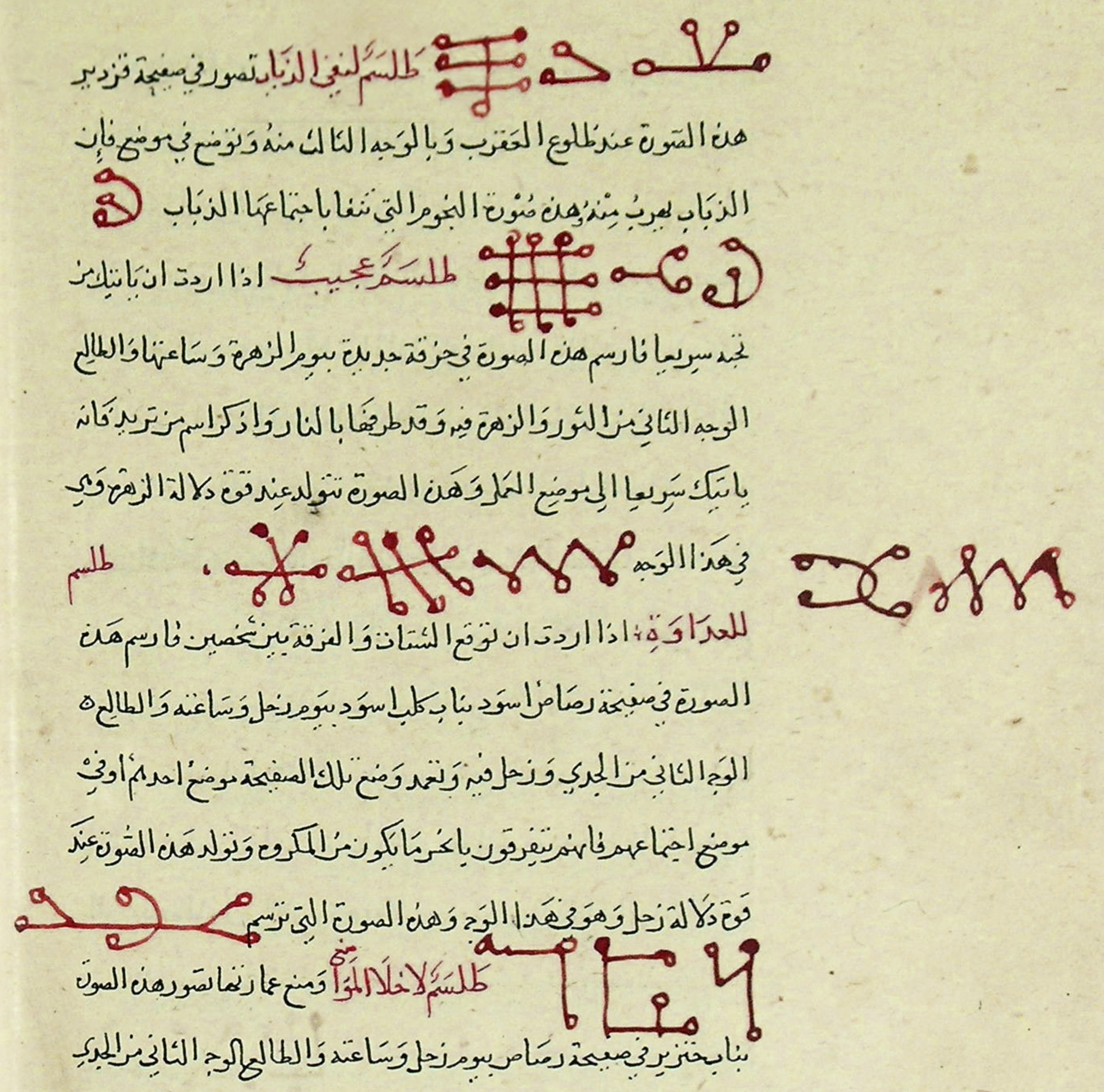
Same section in an undated Ghayat al-Hakim manuscript (Istanbul, Hamidiye 852).

The Arab historian, Ibn Khaldun, in his Muqaddimah, ascribed authorship of Picatrix (referring to the original Arabic version, under the title Ġāyat al-Ḥakīm غاية الحكيم ) to the astronomer and mathematician Maslama Al-Majriti, who died between 1005 CE and 1008 CE (398 AH). This attribution is problematic: the author of the Arabic original states in its introduction that he completed the book on 348 AH, which is ~ 959 CE. Moreover, the author states that he started writing the Picatrix after he completed his previous book, Rutbat al-Ḥakīm رتبة الحكيم in 343 AH (~ 954 CE). This makes the authoring more than five decades before Al-Majriti's death, and if his estimated birth year is to be accepted, he would have only been around 5 years old when he started writing it. As well, according to Holmyard, the earliest manuscript attribution of the work to Maslama al-Majriti was made by the alchemist al-Jildaki, who died shortly after 1360, while Ibn Khaldun died some 20 years later. However, no biography of al-Majriti mentions him as the author of this work.

More recent attributions of authorship range from "the Arabic version is anonymous" to reiterations of the old claim that the author is "the celebrated astronomer and mathematician Abu l-Qasim Maslama b. Ahmad Al-Majriti". One recent study in Studia Islamica suggests that the authorship of this work should be attributed to Maslama b. Qasim al-Qurtubi, who died 964 CE (353 AH) and, according to Ibn al-Faradi, was "a man of charms and talismans". If this suggestion is correct it would place the work in the context of Andalusian sufism and batinism.

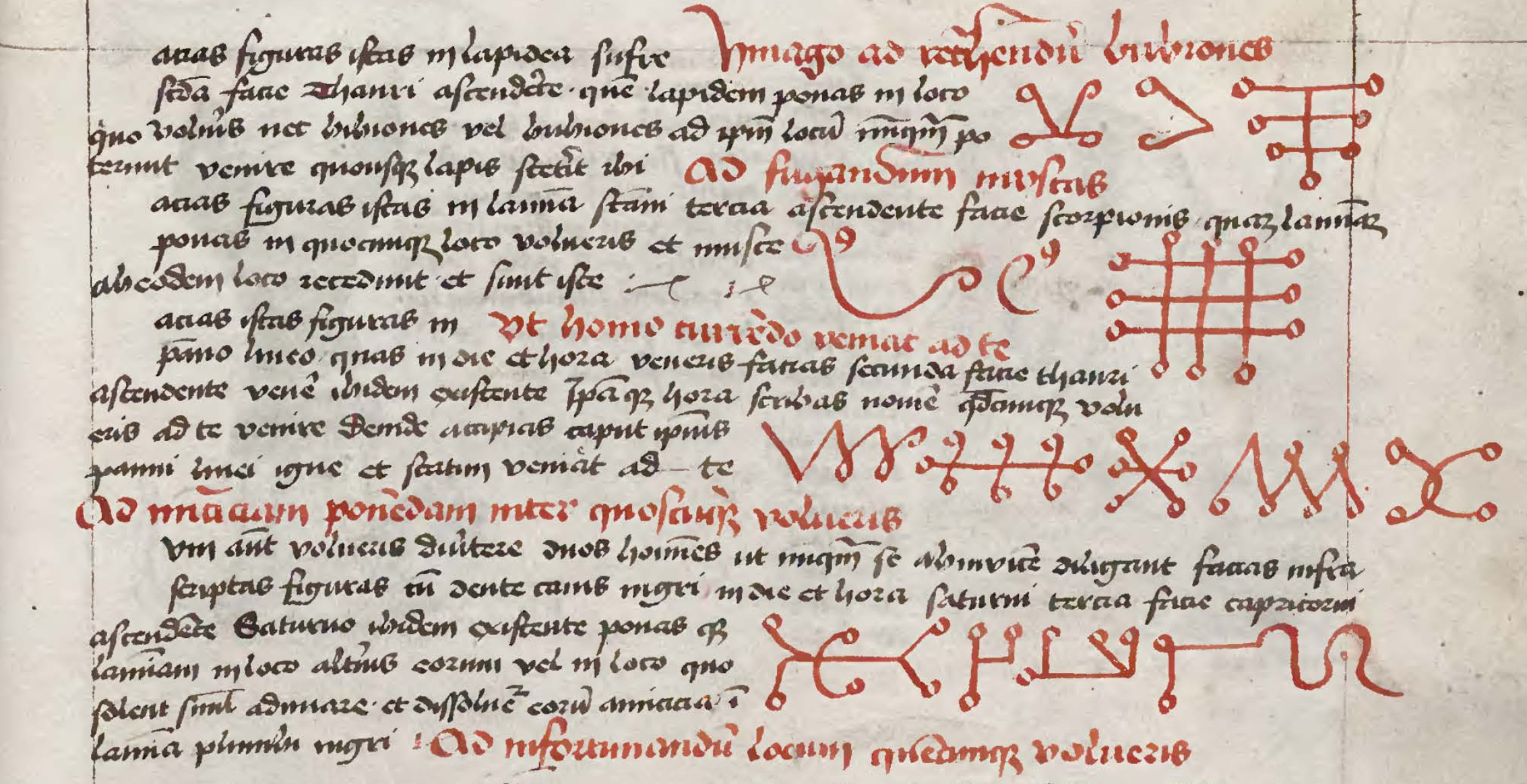
Same section in a Latin manuscript of the Picatrix (man. Kraków, Jagiellonian Library MS 793).

The odd Latin title is sometimes explained as a sloppy transliteration of one "Buqratis", mentioned several times in the second of the four books of the work. Others have suggested that the title (or the name of the author) is a way of attributing the work to Hippocrates (via a transcription of the name Burqratis or Biqratis in the Arabic text). Where it appears in the Arabic original, the Latin text does translate the name Burqratis as Picatrix, but this still does not establish the identity of Burqratis. Ultimately, linking the name, Picatrix, with Hippocrates, has fallen into disfavor because the text separately cites Hippocrates under the name Ypocras.

Contrary to this, an argument has been made that the name Picatrix is a translation of the author's individual or personal name "Maslama" due to the parallel derivation of masculine and feminine versions of both names. It is alleged that the word picatrix would be the feminine of picator which is then derived from picare, meaning "to prick." This is linked with the observation that Maslama has the Arabic feminine termination "-a" and whose root word (s-l-m) has the meaning ladagha or "to sting."

== Anticipation of experimental method ==
Martin Plessner suggests that a translator of the Picatrix established a medieval definition of scientific experiment by changing a passage in the Hebrew translation of the Arabic original, establishing a theoretical basis for the experimental method:

"the invention of an hypothesis in order to explain a certain natural process, then the arranging of conditions under which that process may intentionally be brought about in accordance with the hypothesis, and finally, the justification or refutation of the hypothesis, depending on the outcome of the experiment".

Plessner notes that it is generally agreed that awareness of "the specific nature of the experimental method—as distinct from the practical use of it—is an achievement of the 16th and 17th centuries." However, as the passage by the translator of the Hebrew version makes clear, the fundamental theoretical basis for the experimental method was here established prior to the middle of the 13th century.

The original passage in Arabic describes how a man who witnessed a treatment for a scorpion's sting (drinking a potion of frankincense that had received seal imprints) had gone on to experiment with different types of frankincense, assuming that this was the cause for the cure, but later found that the seal images were the cause for the cure, regardless of the substance upon which they were impressed. The author of the Picatrix goes on to explain how the explanation of the effectiveness of cures passed on to him by authorities was then proved to him by his own experience.

The Hebrew translator changed the passage in question to include the following:

And that was the reason which incited me [to devote myself to astrological magic]. Moreover, these secrets were already made known by Nature, and the experience approved them. The man dealing with nature has nothing to do but producing a reason of what the experience has brought out.

Plessner also notes that "neither the Arabic psychology of study nor the Hebrew definition of the experiment is rendered in the Latin Picatrix. The Latin translator omits many theoretical passages throughout the work."

In exploring the cross-cultural circulation of the text Avner Ben-Zaken enlisted to the Picatrix's scholarship the “Yates thesis,” and argued that the text played a latent, though central, role in shaping the philosophy of Renaissance natural magic and in giving the stimulus needed to transform occultist notions into experimental science. For Renaissance thinkers unfriendly to the establishment, natural magic offered an alternative program for natural philosophy, and some turned it against Aristotelian philosophy, which they viewed as hegemonic. Moreover, these rebels presented natural magic as a scientific practice, a culture deeply grounded in non-European contexts. For Ficino and Pico, natural magic originated in the ancient Near East, brought to Renaissance Europe through cross-cultural exchanges that involved Kabalistic texts and Arabic works on magic. For Agrippa, natural magic carried a new program for science, as well as new practices and new personas. For him, the magus—the new experimental naturalist—was a figure that first came to life in the ancient East. For Campanella, natural magic offered a bottom-up construction of natural philosophy that also entailed a new organization of society, in which reason and firsthand experience order both nature and society. All perceived Picatrix as a text that embodied both: a strong alternative program for the study of nature, and a strong cultural program for challenging European culture from outside. In imagining this alternative, they eventually returned their science to its historical point of origin, the East. Ficino, Agrippa, and in a sense Campanella pushed the argument further, laying a foundation for a heliocentric worldview, initiating the search for the hidden forces of nature, and casting the magician virtuoso as the godfather of natural philosophy.

Thus, the Picatrix was essential for turning natural magic into philosophy, for transforming the magus into an experimentalist, and for transforming the practice of natural magic into an institutional system of education. It inspired the proposal that scholars shift their focus from Scholasticism to the distant sources of natural magic.

== Editions ==
- غاية الحكيم Ghāyat al-Ḥakīm: An edition of the text in Arabic, edited by Hellmut Ritter (from the Warburg Institute)
- Picatrix: Das Ziel des Weisen von Pseudo-Magriti, aus dem Arabischen ins Deutsche übersetzt von Hellmut Ritter und Martin Plessner [Picatrix: The Goal of the Wise Man by Pseudo-Magriti, translated from Arabic into German by Ritter and Plessner]. London: Warburg Institute, 1962 (=Studies of the Warburg Institute 27).
- David Pingree, The Latin Version of the Ghayat al-hakim, Studies of the Warburg Institute, University of London (1986), ISBN 0-85481-069-2
- Ouroboros Press has published the first English translation available in two volumes, Ouroborous Press (2002 Vol. 1 ASIN: B0006S6LAO) and (2008 Vol. 2)
- Béatrice Bakhouche, Frédéric Fauquier, Brigitte Pérez-Jean, Picatrix: Un Traite De Magie Medieval, Brepols Pub (2003), 388 p., ISBN 978-2-503-51068-2.
- The Complete Picatrix: The Occult Classic Of Astrological Magic , Renaissance Astrology Press (2011), 310 p., ISBN 1-257-76785-2, English translation from Pingree's Latin critical edition by John Michael Greer & Christopher Warnock.
- Picatrix: A Medieval Treatise on Astral Magic, translated with an introduction by Dan Attrell and David Porreca, 384 p., Penn State University Press, 2019.

== See also ==
- Grimoires – i.e. books about magic
- Alchemy and chemistry in Islam
- Islamic astrology
- Ruhaniyya
- Necronomicon
