= Ibn Wahshiyya =

10th-century writer on agriculture, plants, and magic

Ibn Waḥshiyya
- ابن وحشية
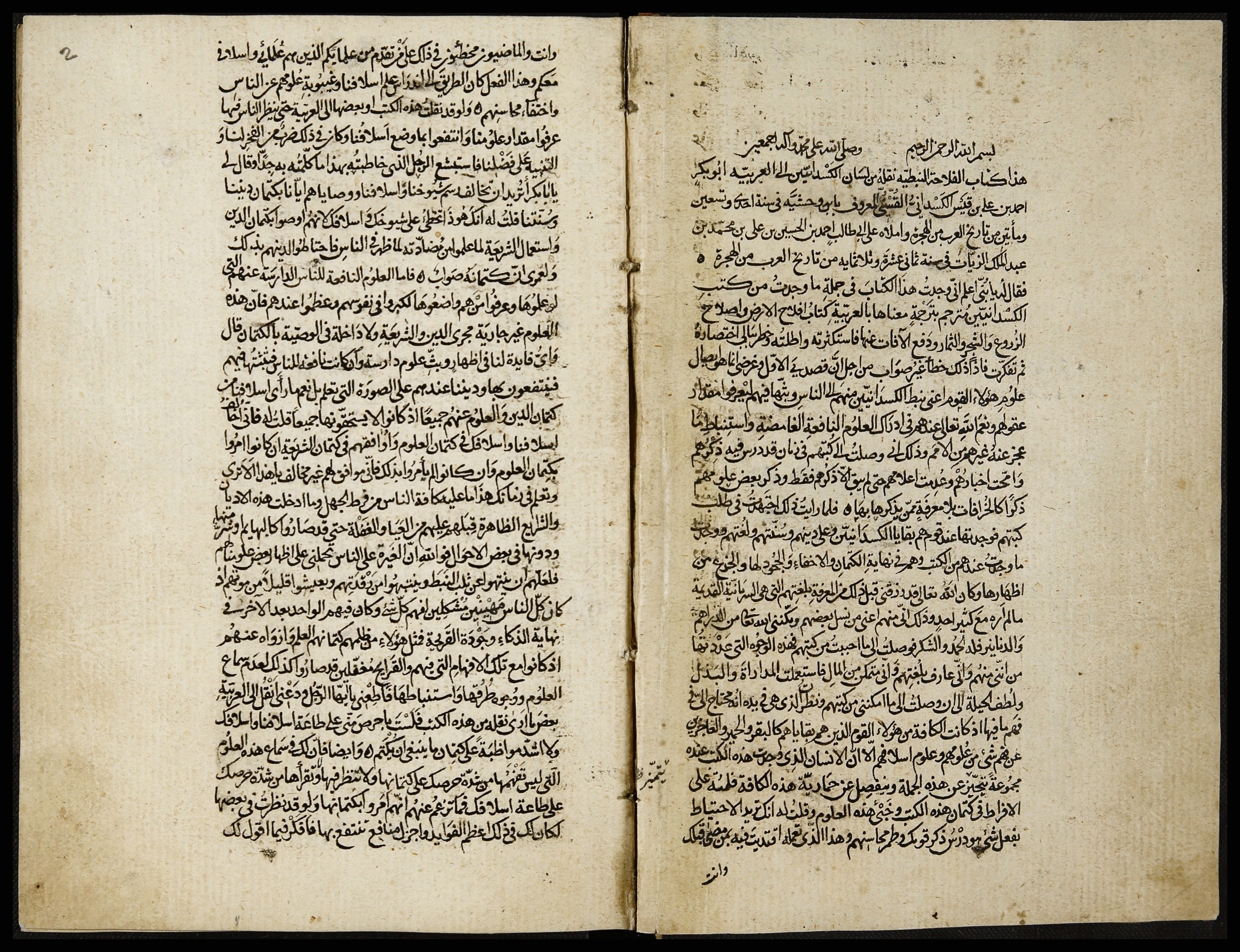
- Beginning of The Nabataean Agriculture from a 17th-century manuscript
- Died: 930–1 CE (318 AH)

Philosophical work
- Era: Islamic Golden Age
- Region: Kufa (Iraq)
- Language: Arabic
- Main interests: Agriculture, botany, toxicology, alchemy and chemistry, magic
- Notable works: The Nabataean Agriculture

Ibn Waḥshiyya (Arabic: ابن وحشية), died c. 930, was a Nabataean (Aramaic-speaking, rural Iraqi) agriculturalist, toxicologist, and alchemist born in Qussīn, near Kufa in Iraq. He is the author of the Nabataean Agriculture (Kitāb al-Filāḥa al-Nabaṭiyya), an influential Arabic work on agriculture, astrology, and magic.

Already by the end of the tenth century, various works were being falsely attributed to him. One of these spurious writings, the Kitāb Shawq al-mustahām fī maʿrifat rumūz al-aqlām ("The Book of the Desire of the Maddened Lover for the Knowledge of Secret Scripts", perhaps 1022–3 CE), is notable as an early proposal that some Egyptian hieroglyphs could be read phonetically, rather than only logographically.

== Name ==
His full name was Abū Bakr Aḥmad ibn ʿAlī ibn [Qays ibn] al-Mukhtār ibn ʿAbd al-Karīm ibn Ḥarathyā ibn Badanyā ibn Barṭānyā ibn ʿĀlāṭyā al-Kasdānī al-Ṣūfī.

Just like the semi-legendary Jabir ibn Hayyan, he carried the nisba al-Ṣūfī despite the fact that he is not known to have engaged in or to have written anything about Sufism. The nisba al-Kasdānī is a variant of al-Kaldānī ('Chaldaean'), a term referring to the native inhabitants of Mesopotamia that was also used in Greek, but (given the known -shd-/-ld- variation in Babylonian language) may perhaps be based on a living oral tradition indigenous to Iraq.

== Biography ==
Ibn Wahshiyya was likely born in Qussīn (Iraq) and died in the year 318 of the Islamic calendar (= 930-1 CE). Very little else is known about his life. Our main source of information are Ibn Wahshiyya's own writings, as well as the short entry in Ibn al-Nadim's (died c. 995) Fihrist, where he is explicitly said to be among the "authors whose life is not well known". Ibn Wahshiyya himself claimed to be a descendant of the Neo-Assyrian king Sennacherib (r. 705 – 681 BCE), whom the rural, Aramaic-speaking population of southern Iraq (known to Arabic authors of Ibn Wahshiyya's time as 'Nabataeans') revered as their illustrious ancestor. Despite the fact that these Iraqi 'Nabataeans' (Note: These Iraqi 'Nabataeans' are not to be confused with the ancient Nabataeans of Petra, with whom they have nothing in common.) were generally looked down upon as lowly peasants by the contemporary Arab elite, Ibn Wahshiyya identified himself as one of them. Ibn Wahshiyya's self-identification as 'Nabataean' seems credible given the accurate use of Aramaic terms in his works.

== Works ==
Ibn Wahshiyya's works were written down and redacted after his death by his student and scribe Abū Ṭālib al-Zayyāt. They were used not only by later agriculturalists, but also by authors of works on magic like Maslama al-Qurṭubī (died 964, author of the Ghāyat al-ḥakīm, "The Aim of the Sage", Latin: Picatrix), and by philosophers like Maimonides (1138–1204) in his Dalālat al-ḥāʾirīn ("Guide for the Perplexed", c. 1190).

Ibn al-Nadim, in his Kitāb al-Fihrist (c. 987), lists approximately twenty works attributed to Ibn Wahshiyya. However, most of these were probably not written by Ibn Wahshiyya himself, but rather by other tenth-century authors inspired by him.

=== The Nabataean Agriculture ===
Ibn Wahshiyya's major work, the Nabataean Agriculture (Kitāb al-Filāḥa al-Nabaṭiyya, c. 904), claims to have been translated from an "ancient Syriac" original, written c. 20,000 years ago by the ancient inhabitants of Mesopotamia. In Ibn Wahshiyya's time, Syriac was thought to have been the primordial language used at the time of creation. While the work may indeed have been translated from a Syriac original, in reality Syriac is a language that only emerged in the first century. By the ninth century, it had become the carrier of a rich literature, including many works translated from the Greek. The book's extolling of Babylonian civilization against that of the conquering Arabs forms part of a wider movement (the Shu'ubiyya movement) in the early Abbasid period (750-945 CE), which witnessed the emancipation of non-Arabs from their former status as second-class Muslims.

=== Other works ===
==== The Book of the Desire of the Maddened Lover for the Knowledge of Secret Scripts ====
One of the works attributed to Ibn Wahshiyya is the Kitāb Shawq al-mustahām fī maʿrifat rumūz al-aqlām ("The Book of the Desire of the Maddened Lover for the Knowledge of Secret Scripts”), a work dealing amongst other things with Egyptian hieroglyphs. Its author refers to his extensive travels in Egypt, but Ibn Wahshiyya himself seems never to have visited Egypt, a country which he barely even mentions in his authentic works. For this and other reasons, scholars believe the work to be spurious. According to Jaakko Hämeen-Anttila, it may have been authored by Hasan ibn Faraj, an obscure descendant of the Harranian Sabian scholar Sinan ibn Thabit ibn Qurra (c. 880–943) who claimed to have merely copied the work in the year 413 AH, corresponding to 1022–3 CE.

==== The Book of Poisons ====
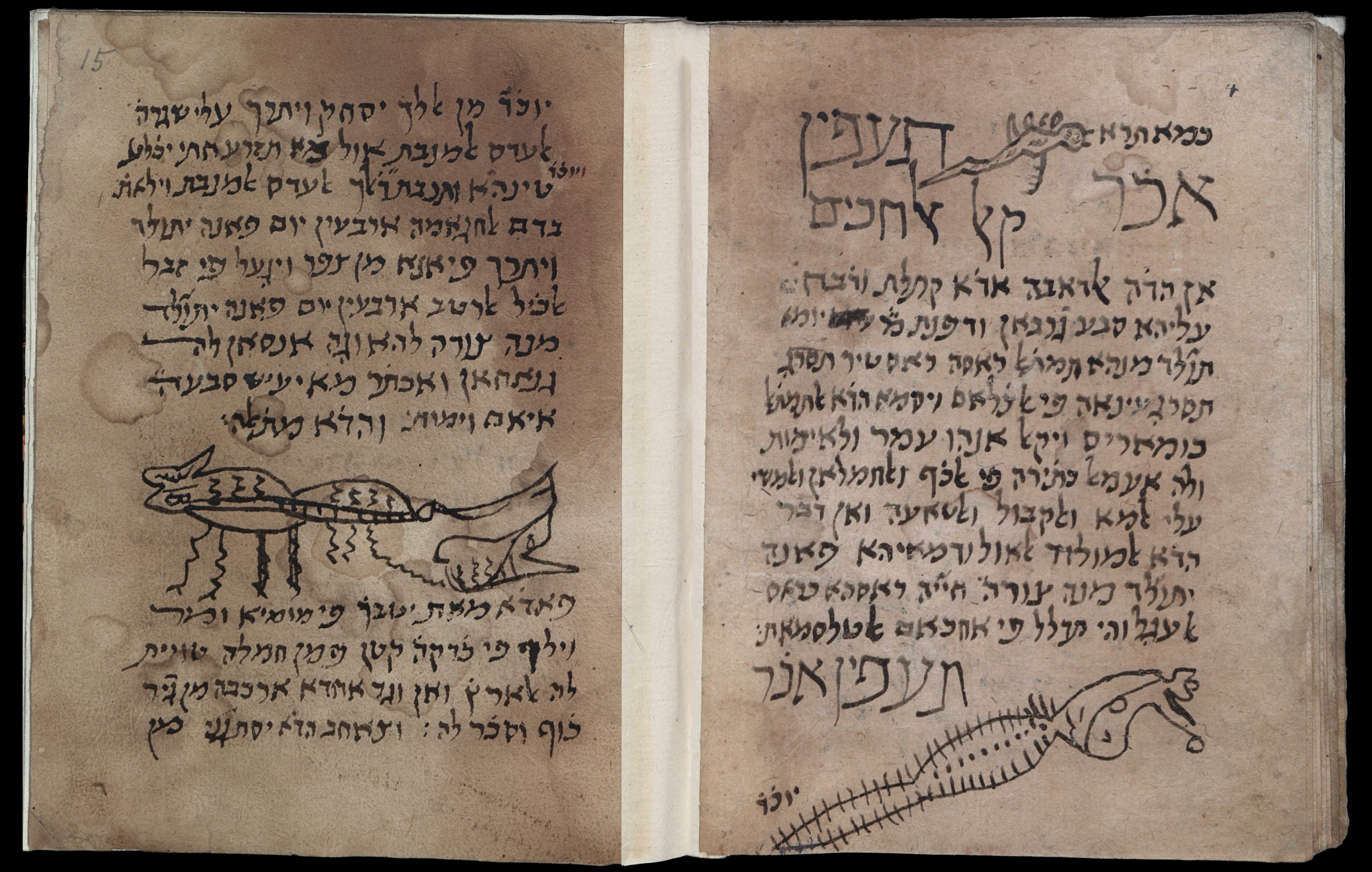
Excerpt about snake venoms and their effects and treatment from a ca. 17th-century Judeo-Arabic manuscript of the Book of Poisons

Another work attributed to Ibn Wahshiyya is a treatise on toxicology called the Book of Poisons, which combines contemporary knowledge on pharmacology with magic and astrology. This treatise was strongly influenced by Indian sources.

==== Cryptography ====
The works attributed to Ibn Wahshiyya contain several cipher alphabets that were used to encrypt magic formulas.

== Later influence ==
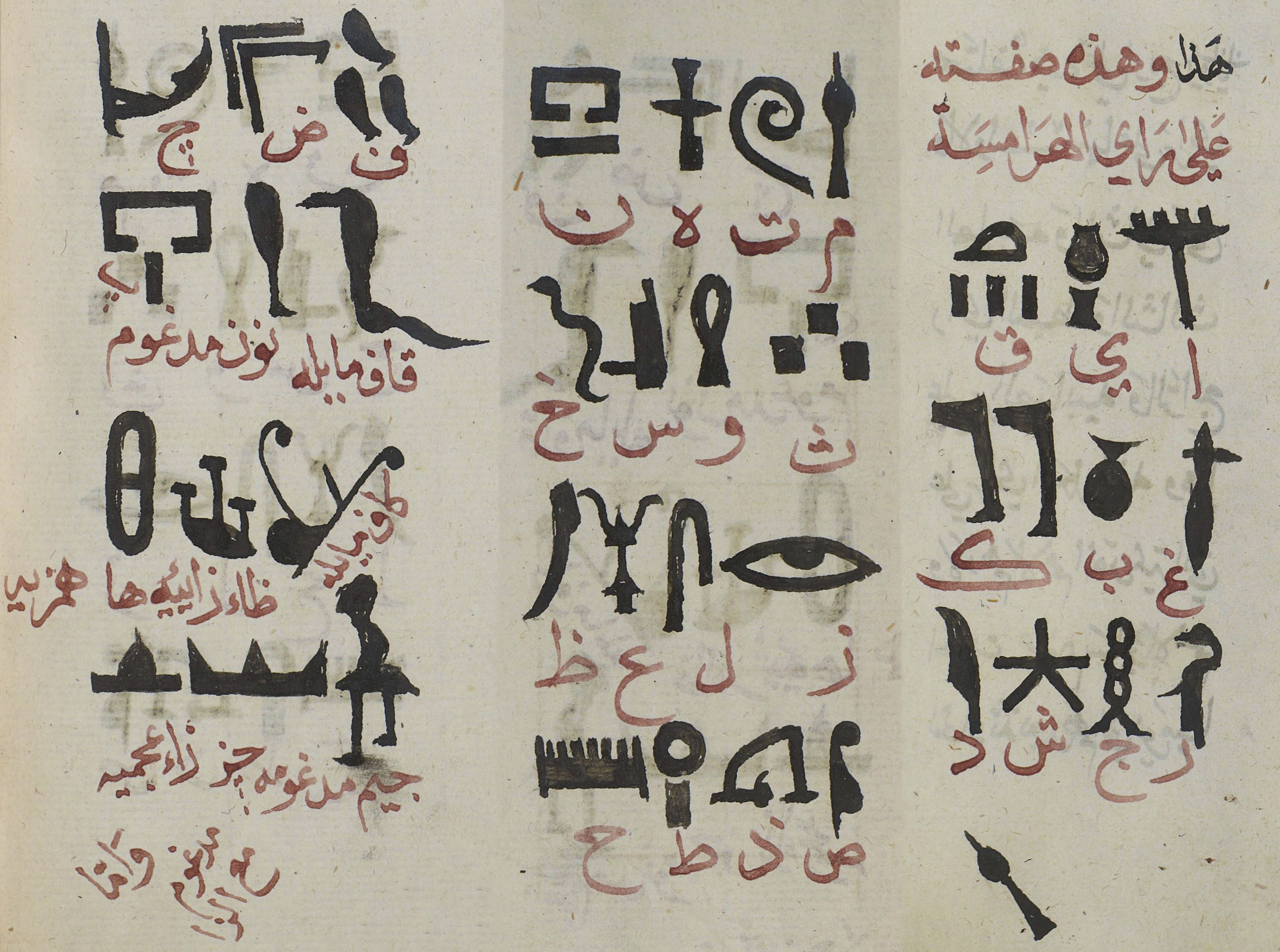
Attempted translation of Egyptian hieroglyphs by pseudo-Ibn Wahshiyyah (from Shawq al-mustahām, Paris MS Arabe 6805, fol. 92v–93v).

Pseudo-Ibn Wahshiyya's Kitāb Shawq al-mustahām fī maʿrifat rumūz al-aqlām ("The Book of the Desire of the Maddened Lover for the Knowledge of Secret Scripts", perhaps 1022–3 CE, see above), has been claimed by Egyptologist Okasha El-Daly to have correctly identified the phonetic value of a number of Egyptian hieroglyphs. However, other scholars have been highly sceptical about El-Daly's claims on the accuracy of these identifications, which betray a keen interest in (as well as some basic knowledge of) the nature of Egyptian hieroglyphs, but are in fact for the most part incorrect.

The book was translated into English by Joseph von Hammer-Purgstall in 1806 as Ancient Alphabets and Hieroglyphic Characters Explained; with an Account of the Egyptian Priests, their Classes, Initiation, and Sacrifices in the Arabic Language by Ahmad Bin Abubekr Bin Wahishih.

== See also ==
- Alchemy
- Alchemy and chemistry in the medieval Islamic world
- Arab Agricultural Revolution
- History of agriculture
- Ibn Abi Usaybi'a
- Science in the medieval Islamic world
- The Nabataean Agriculture (Ibn Wahshiyya's major work)

== Bibliography ==
- Colla, Elliot (2008). "Review of El-Daly 2005". International Journal of Middle East Studies. 40 (1): 135–137. doi:10.1017/S0020743807080142. S2CID 162412180.
- De Callataÿ, Godefroid; Moureau, Sébastien (2017). "A Milestone in the History of Andalusī Bāṭinism: Maslama b. Qāsim al-Qurṭubī's Riḥla in the East". Intellectual History of the Islamicate World. 5 (1): 86–117. doi:10.1163/2212943X-00501004. hdl:2078.1/167526.
- El-Daly, Okasha (2005). Egyptology: The Missing Millennium. Ancient Egypt in Medieval Arabic Writings. London: UCL Press.
- Fierro, Maribel (1996). "Bāṭinism in Al-Andalus: Maslama b. Qāsim al-Qurṭubī (d. 353/964), Author of the Rutbat al-Ḥakīm and the Ghāyat al-Ḥakīm (Picatrix)". Studia Islamica. 84 (84): 87–112. doi:10.2307/1595996. hdl:10261/281028. JSTOR 1595996.
- Hämeen-Anttila, Jaakko (2006). The Last Pagans of Iraq: Ibn Wahshiyya And His Nabatean Agriculture. Leiden: Brill.
- Hämeen-Anttila, Jaakko (2018). "Ibn Waḥshiyya". In Fleet, Kate; Krämer, Gudrun; Matringe, Denis; Nawas, John; Rowson, Everett (eds.). Encyclopaedia of Islam, Three. doi:10.1163/1573-3912_ei3_COM_32287.
- Hammer, Joseph von (1806). Ancient Alphabets and Hieroglyphic Characters Explained; with an Account of the Egyptian Priests, their Classes, Initiation, and Sacrifices in the Arabic Language by Ahmad Bin Abubekr Bin Wahshih. London: Bulmer.
- Rubin, Milka (1998). "The Language of Creation or the Primordial Language: A Case of Cultural Polemics in Antiquity". Journal of Jewish Studies. 49 (2): 306–333. doi:10.18647/2120/JJS-1998.
- Stephan, Tara (2017). "Writing the Past: Ancient Egypt through the Lens of Medieval Islamic Thought". In Lowry, Joseph E.; Toorawa, Shawkat M. (eds.). Arabic Humanities, Islamic Thought: Essays in Honor of Everett K. Rowson. Leiden: Brill. ISBN 978-90-04-34329-0.
- Toral-Niehoff, Isabel; Sundermeyer, Annette (2018). "Going Egyptian in Medieval Arabic Culture. The Long-Desired Fulfilled Knowledge of Occult Alphabets by Pseudo-Ibn Waḥshiyya". In El-Bizri, Nader; Orthmann, Eva (eds.). The Occult Sciences in Pre-modern Islamic Cultures. Würzburg: Ergon. pp. 249–263.
- Whitman, Michael (2010). Principles of Information Security. London: Course Technology. ISBN 978-1-111-13821-9.
