= Jaakko Hämeen-Anttila =

Finnish academic (1963–2023)

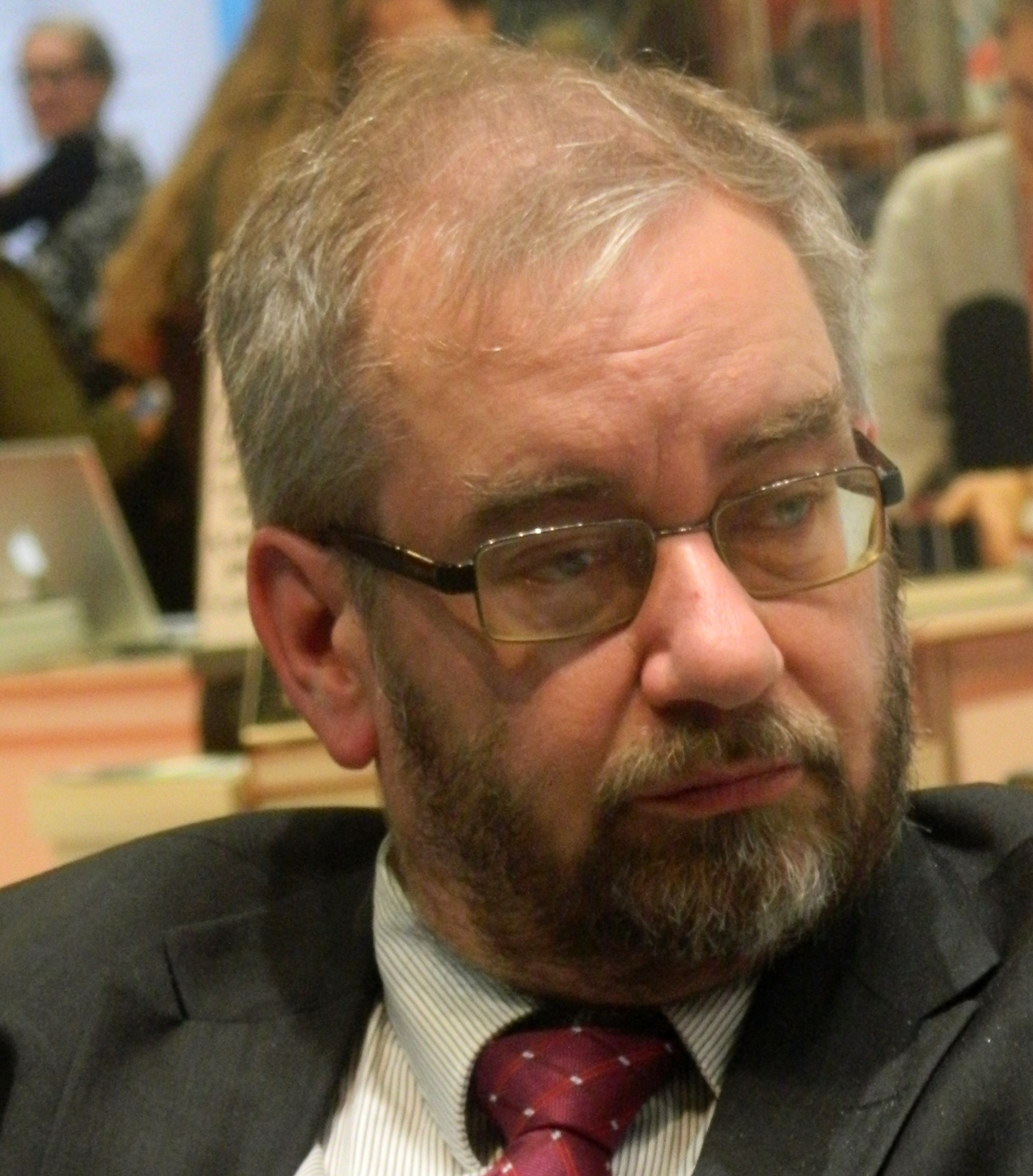
- Hämeen-Anttila in 2017
- Born: 26 February 1963; Oulu, Finland
- Died: 18 December 2023 (aged 60)
- Scientific career
- Fields: Arabic language and Islam
- Workplaces: University of Helsinki; University of Edinburgh
- Doctoral advisor: Kaj Öhrnberg

Jaakko Markus Hämeen-Anttila (26 February 1963 – 18 December 2023) was a Finnish academic researcher, serving as a professor of the Arabic language and Islamic studies at the University of Edinburgh. Before that he was a professor at the University of Helsinki.

== Biography ==
Jaakko Hämeen-Anttila was born on 16 February 1963. He was one of the leading researchers of Islam in Finland. He wrote many popular books on Islamic culture, history and poetry. Hämeen-Anttila also translated the Qur'an into Finnish in the year 1995 and the Epic of Gilgamesh in the year 2000. He served on the editorial board of the Journal of Arabic and Islamic Studies. Hämeen-Anttila was married to the academic researcher and novelist Virpi Hämeen-Anttila. Jaakko Hämeen-Anttila died on 18 December 2023, at the age of 60.

== Awards ==
- In year 2002 Hämeen-Anttila and his wife Virpi Hämeen-Anttila were awarded the Eino Leino Prize for their efforts to promote a multi-cultural concept of literature. The prize was given out for the 47th time.
- In year 2005 his book Islamin käsikirja (The Handbook of Islam) won the Valtion tiedonjulkistamispalkinto (the State Award for public Information) in Finland.

== Publications ==
=== Books in English ===
- Materials for the Study of Ragaz Poetry. Finnish Oriental Society (1996) ISBN 951-9380-28-0.
- A Sketch of Neo-Assyrian Grammar. State Archives of Assyrian Studies – SAAS 13, 2000.
- Maqama: A History of a Genre. Harrassowitz (2002) ISBN 978-3-447-04591-9.
- The Last Pagans of Iraq: Ibn Wahshiyya And His Nabatean Agriculture (2006) ISBN 90-04-15010-2.
- Case Studies in Transmission (edit.), Ugarit-Verlag, Münster 2015, ISBN 978-3-86835-124-8.
- Khwadāynāmag the Middle Persian Book of Kings, Studies in Persian Cultural History, Volume: 14, Brill, 2018, ISBN 978-9-00427-764-9.

=== Books in Finnish ===
- Johdatus Koraaniin. Gaudeamus 1997, reformed edition 2006. ISBN 951-662-924-5
- Koraanin selitysteos. Basam Books 1997.
- Reunamerkintöjä. Esseitä ja käännöksiä Lähi-idän kirjallisuudesta. Suomen Itämaisen Seuran suomenkielisiä julkaisuja 25, 1997.
- Jeesus, Allahin profeetta. Tutkimus islamilaisen Jeesus-kuvan muotoutumisesta. Suomen Eksegeettisen Seuran Julkaisuja 70, 1998.
  - [Revision:] Jeesus, islamin profeetta. Kirjapaja 2006. ISBN 951-607-330-1
- Islamin monimuotoisuus. Gaudeamus 1999.
- Islam-taskusanakirja. Basam Books 2001.
- Kaksi filosofia. Avicennan ja al-Ghazālīn omaelämäkerrat. Basam Books 2001. (ed. Hämeen-Anttila, trans. with T. Kukkonen)
- Tiedon valtameri. Islamilaista viisautta. Basam Books 2001.
- Uskontojen risteyksissä. Välimeren alueen uskontojen juurilla. Toim. Jaakko Hämeen-Anttila. Gaudeamus 2001.
- Jumalasta juopuneet. Islamin mystiikan käsikirja. Basam Books 2002.
- Todellisuuden maailmat. Runoja ja proosaa islamin mystikoilta. Basam Books 2002.
- Islamin käsikirja. Otava 2004.
- Tarina hullusta rakastajasta ja muita runoja. Gummerus 2005. (poetry collection)
- Rakkauden atlas. Otava 2005. (with Virpi Hämeen-Anttila)
- Usko. Kirjapaja 2005.
- Mare Nostrum. Länsimaisen kulttuurin juurilla. Otava 2006.
- Kirkkauteen kätketty. Al-Ghazālīn Valojen lamppusyvennys. Kirjapaja 2007. (with Inka Maukola and Mikko Viitamäki)
- Matkalla Marakandaan. Gummerus 2007. (poetry collection)
- Tarujen kirja. Kansojen kertomuksia läheltä ja kaukaa. Otava 2007. (with Virpi Hämeen-Anttila)
- Kalifien kirjastossa. Arabialais-islamilaisen tieteen historia. Avain 2011. (with Inka Nokso-Koivisto)
- Trippi ihmemaahan. Huumeiden kulttuurihistoria. Otava 2013.
- Nälästä nautintoihin. Ruoan tarina. Otava 2015. (with Venla Rossi)

=== Translations in Finnish ===
- Sa'dī, Ruusutarha. Otava 1991.
- Koraani. Basam Books 1995.
- Mawlānā Jalalāddīn Rūmī, Ruokopillin tarinoita. Basam Books 1995.
- Valkoisen kaupungin viisas mulla. Kertomuksia mulla Nasraddinista. Basam Books 1996.
  - [Revision:] Viisas narri. Kertomuksia mulla Nasraddinista. Basam Books 2007.
- Badī'azzaman al-Hamadhāni, Mestari Abulfathin elämä ja teot. Veijaritarinoita kalifien ajalta. Basam Books 1997.
- Viisauden eliksiiri. Antiikin kreikkalaista viisautta arabialaisista lähteistä. Basam Books 1997.
- Omār Khayyām, Malja mennyt maine. Basam Books 1999.
- Ibn Isḥāq, Profeetta Muhammadin elämäkerta. Toim. Ibn Hišām. Basam Books 1999.
- Runoja Andalusiasta. Basam Books 1999. (with Minna Tuovinen)
- Vain ääni jää. Kolme persialaista runoilijaa. WSOY 1999.
  - [Revision:] Vain ääni jää. Runoja Iranista. WSOY 2006.
- Gilgamesh. Kertomus ikuisen elämän etsimisestä. Basam Books 2000.
- Kuka murhasi kyttyräselän? Tarinoita Tuhannesta ja yhdestä yöstä. Basam Books 2001.
- Mawlānā Jalalāddīn Rūmī, Rakkaus on musta leijona. Basam Books 2002.
- Farīdaddīn 'Attār, Lintujen matka. Basam Books 2003.
- Hanan al-Šaikh, Kaukana Lontoossa. Gummerus 2003.
- Hāfez, Ruusu ja satakieli. Basam Books 2004.
- Abū Nuwās, Runoja kaduilta ja kapakoista. Basam Books 2004.
- Abul-Alā' al-Ma'arrī, Runoja elämän tarpeettomuudesta. Basam Books 2006.
- Adonis, Tomun taikuri. Otava 2007.
