= Ibn Bassal =

11th-century Andalusian agronomist

- Born: 1050 C.E
- Known for: Botany, agronomy, horticulture and arboriculture.

Ibn Bassal (Arabic: ابن بصال) was an 11th-century Andalusian Arab Muslim botanist and agronomist in Toledo and Seville, Spain who wrote about horticulture and arboriculture. He is best known for his book on agronomy, the Dīwān al-filāha (An Anthology of Husbandry).

== Life and work ==
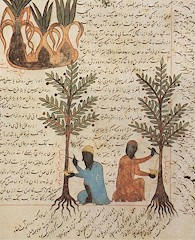
Arboriculture in a medieval Islamic manuscript

Ibn Bassal worked at the Abbadid dynasty court of Al-Mutamid, for whom he created the Hā’īṭ al-Sulṭān botanical garden in Seville. Originally from Toledo, Ibn Bassal moved to Seville after Alfonso VI conquered Toledo in 1085.

He travelled (on pilgrimage) to the Hejaz, visiting Egypt, Sicily, Syria, and seemingly also countries from Abyssinia and Yemen to Iraq, Persia, and India. He returned with knowledge of the cultivation of cotton, and he may well have brought seeds and plants with him for the Toledo botanical garden.

His book, 'Kitāb al-Kasd wa 'l-bayān' is primarily about horticulture. He is best known for his book on agronomy, the Dīwān al-filāha. He also wrote the treatise The Classification of Soils, which divided soil fertility into ten classifications.

== The Dīwān al-filāha ==
Ibn Bassal's magnum opus, his treatise on agronomy entitled Dīwān al-filāḥa (ديوان الفلاحة, "An Anthology of Husbandry"), was originally a copious manuscript that had been dedicated to his botanical garden of Al-Ma’mūn at Toledo. His seminal work was subsequently abridged, during the author's lifetime, and made into a single volume, styled Kitāb al-qaṣd wa’l-bayān (The Book of Concision and Clarity). Although it had originally been compiled in Arabic, the work was later translated into Castilian in the 13th century, and many years later into Spanish.

Ibn Bassal's practical and systematic book Dīwān al-filāha lacks references to other agronomists, and appears to be a record of his own experience. In the book, he describes over 180 cultivated plants, including chickpeas, beans, rice, peas, flax, henbane, sesame, cotton, safflower, saffron, poppies, henna, artichoke; herbs and spices including cumin, caraway, fennel, anise, and coriander; vegetables requiring irrigation or plentiful watering such as cucumbers, melons, mandrake, watermelons, pumpkins and squash, eggplant, asparagus, caper, and colocynth; the root vegetables carrots, radish, garlic, onion, leek, parsnip, the Sudanese pepper, and the dye-yielding madder; leaf vegetables including cabbage, cauliflower, spinach, purslane, amaranth, and chard. He also covers arboriculture, detailing the propagation of the palm, olive, pomegranate, quince, apple, fig, pear, cherry, apricot, plum, peach, almond, walnut, hazelnut, grape, citron, orange, pistachio, pine, cypress, chestnut, holm-oak, deciduous oak, tree of paradise, arbutus, elm and ash.

He describes manure with straw or sweeping mixed in as mudaf, implying that it is not composed of only one material (animal dung) but is a mixture. The sweepings from hot baths included urine and human wastes, which Ibn Bassal describes as dry and salty, unsuitable for use as fertilizer unless mixed with other types of manure. Ibn Bassal gives two recipes for composting pigeon (hamam) and possibly donkey (himar) manure, though the translation is uncertain. Bassal says the excessive heat and moist qualities of pigeon dung works well for weaker and less hardy plants, especially those affected by cold temperatures. Human waste, on the other hand, Bassal advises using in hot temperatures because there is no heat to it. Pig dung, he cautions, will destroy pastures and poison plants, a view also shared by non-Arab writers like Columella and Cassianus Bassus. Compost made without manure is considered less desirable; Ibn Bassal calls this type muwallid, made with herbage, straw and grass, ashes from ovens, and water. Some of Bassal's text was copied by the Yemeni writers Al-Malik al-Afḍal.

== Legacy ==
Ibn Bassal's works were studied several centuries later by Abu Jafar Ahmad Ibn Luyūn al-Tujjbi (d.1349) of Almeria who based his treatise Kitāb Ibdā' al-malāha wa-inhā' al-rajāha fī usūl sinā'at al-filāha on Bassal's work.

== See also ==
- Arab Agricultural Revolution
