= Turks in Tunisia =

Ethnic group in Tunisia

Total population
- 87,000 Approximately 0.7% From the inhabitants of Tunisia

Regions with significant populations
- Mahdia; Tunis; Cap Bon

Religion
- Sunni Islam

The Turks in Tunisia, also known as Turco-Tunisians and Tunisian Turks, were ethnic Turks who lived in Ottoman Tunisia.

In 1534, with about 10,000 Turkish soldiers, the Ottoman Empire took control and settled in the region when Tunisia's inhabitants called for help due to fears that the Spanish would invade the country. Thus, during the Ottoman rule, the Turkish community dominated the political life of the region for centuries; as a result, the ethnic mix of Tunisia changed considerably with the continuous migration of Turks from Anatolia, as well as other parts of the Ottoman territories, for over 300 years. In addition, some Turks intermarried with the local population and their male offspring were called "Kouloughlis". Consequently, the terms "Turks" and "Kouloughlis" were used to distinguish between those of full and partial Turkish ancestry.

== Demographics ==
Families of Turkish origin live mainly near the coastal cities, such as Tunis, Mahdia, Hammamet and the islands (such as Djerba), although there are also many living within central Tunisia as well.

== Culture ==
=== Religion ===
The Ottoman Turks brought with them the teaching of the Hanafi School of Islam during the Ottoman rule of Tunisia, which still survives among the Turkish-descended families today. Traditionally, Turco-Tunisian mosques have octagonal minarets. Examples of Ottoman-Turkish mosques include:

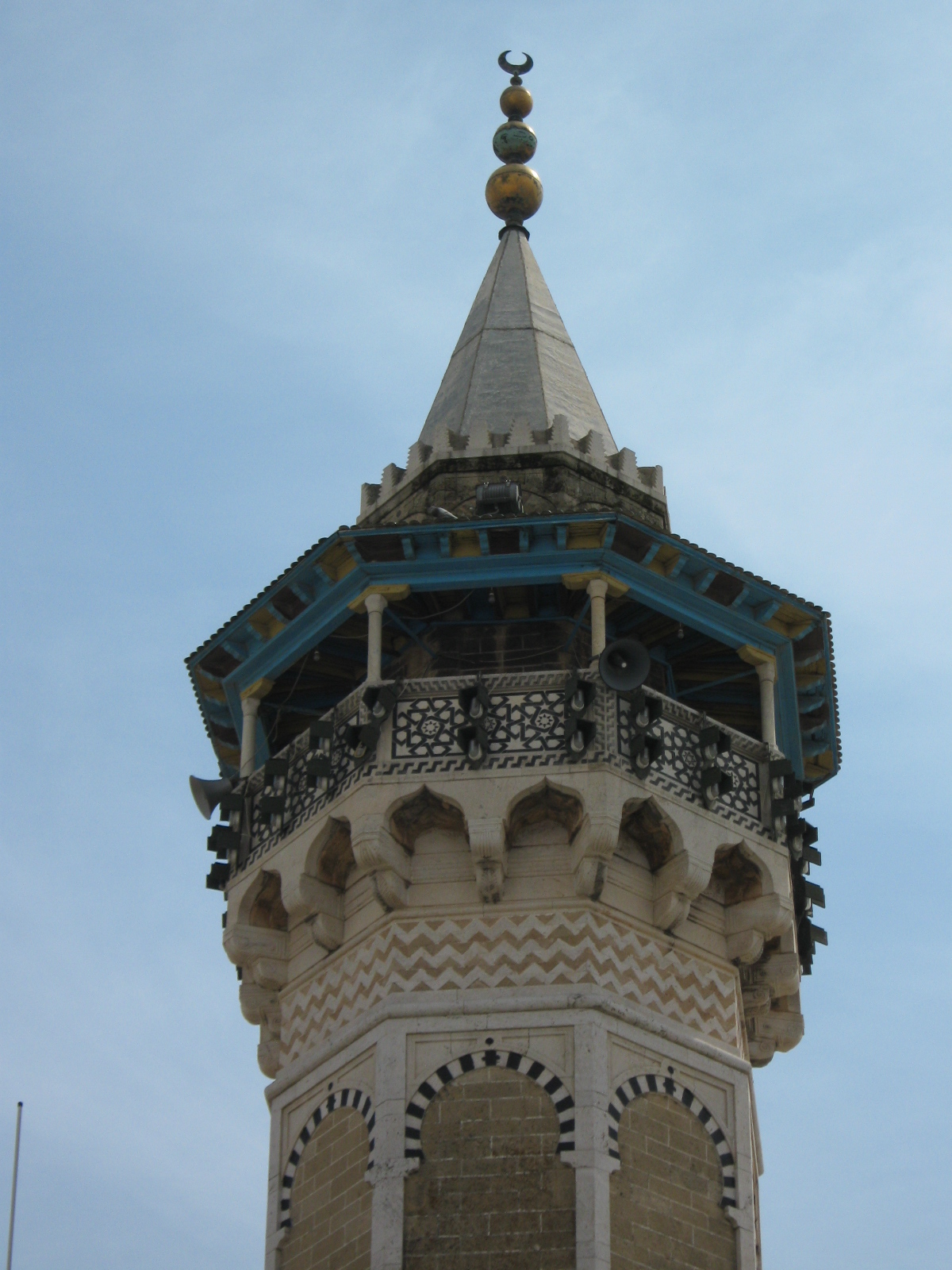
Hammouda Pacha Mosque

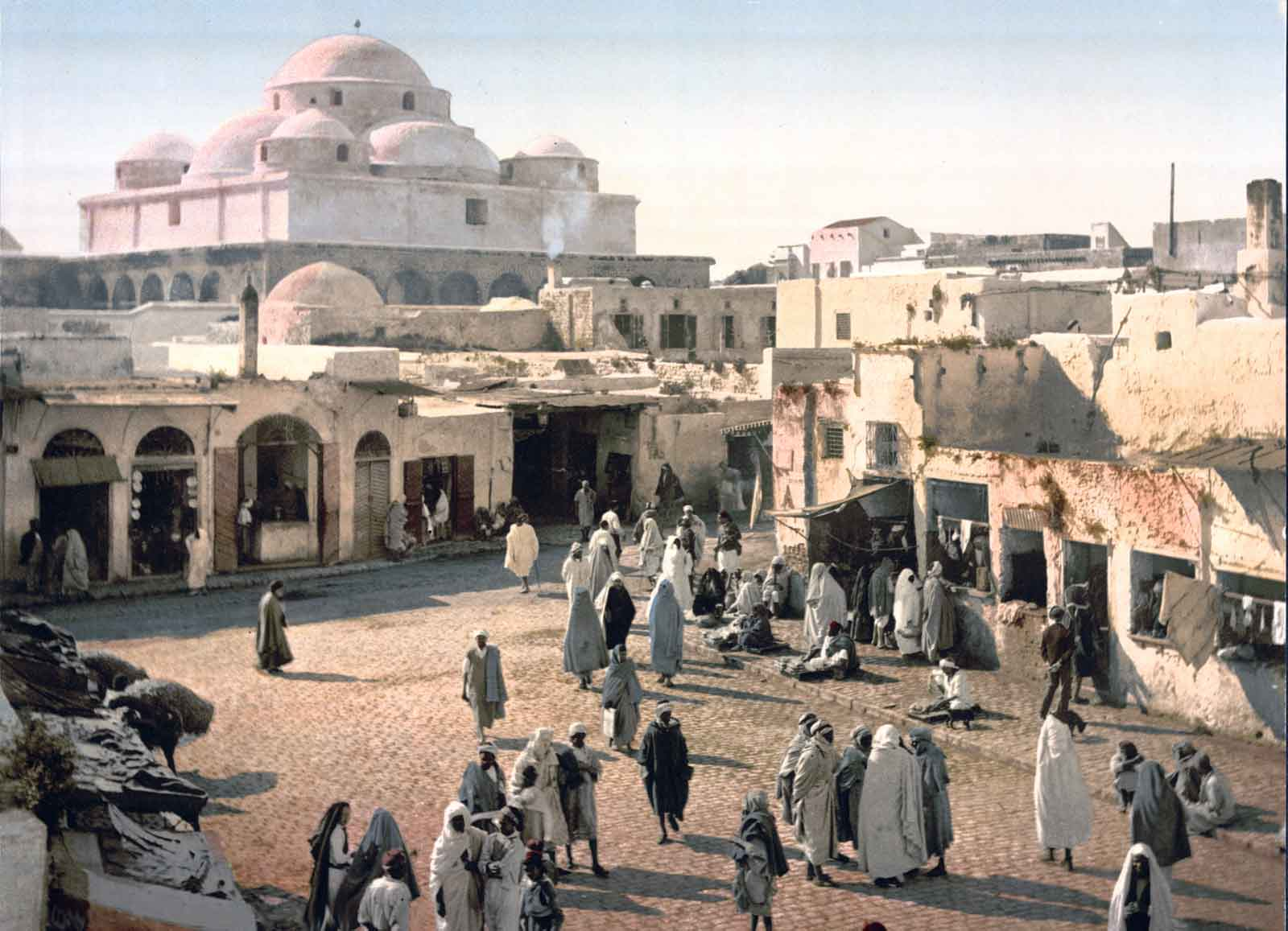
Sidi Mahrez Mosque

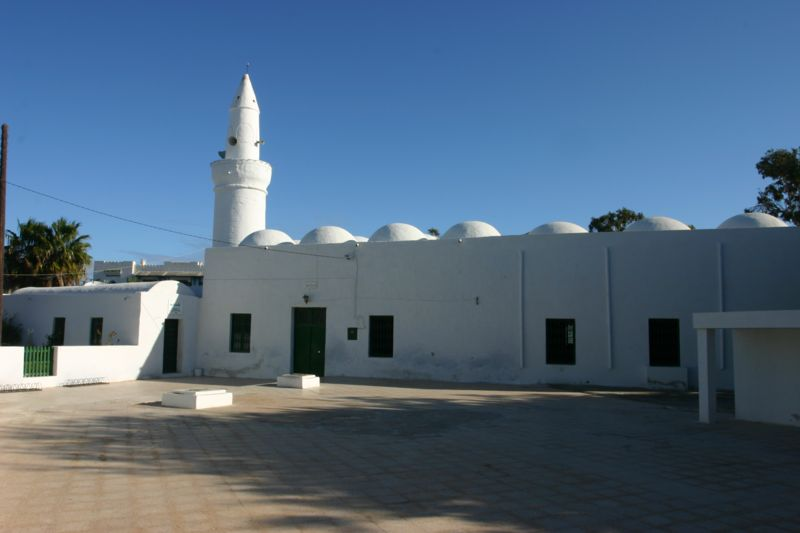
Mosque of the Turks

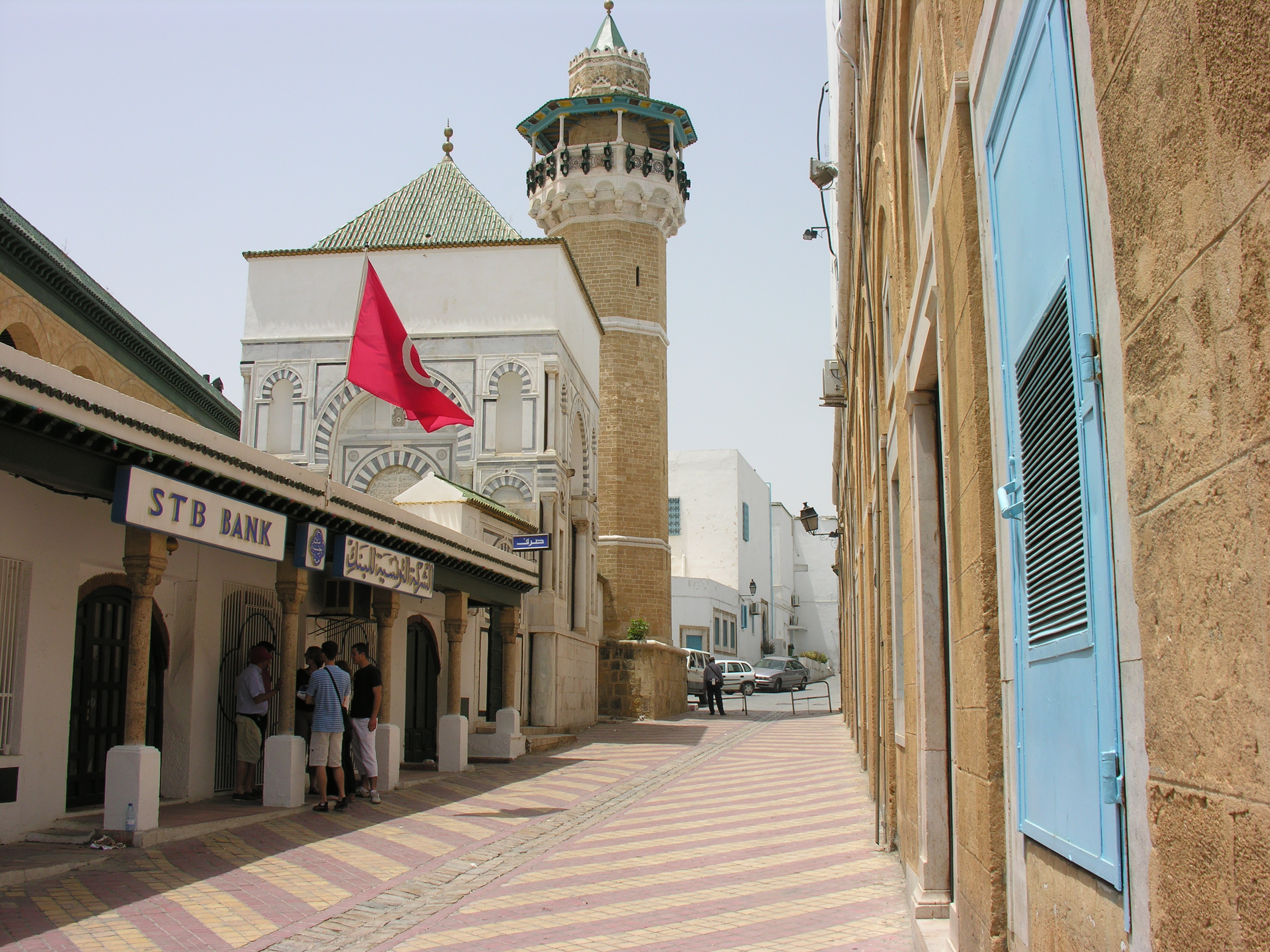
Youssef Dey Mosque

== Notable people ==
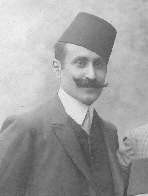
Ali Bach Hamba was a co-founder of the Young Tunisians.

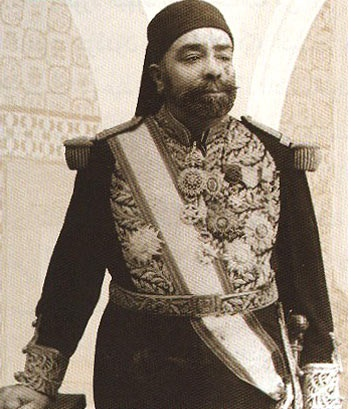
Mustapha Dinguizli served as Prime Minister of Tunisia.

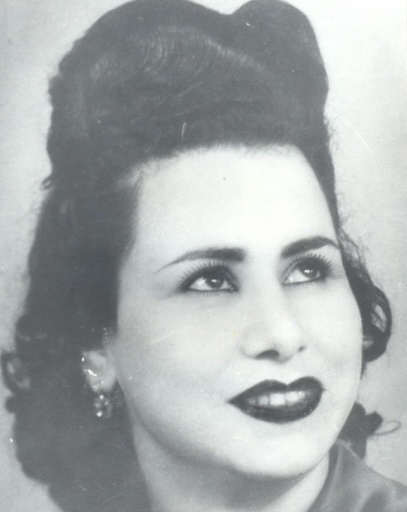
Chafia Rochdi was a singer and actress.

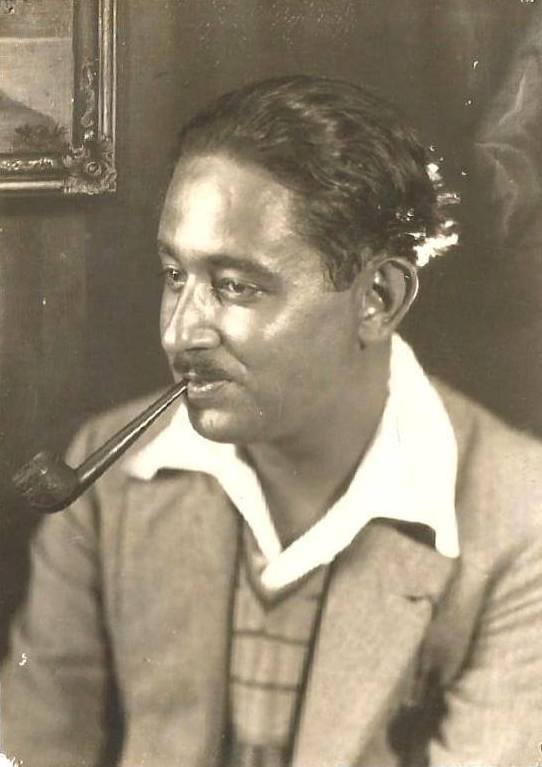
Yahia Turki was a painter.

The Turks in Tunisia were traditionally a privileged élite in Tunisia who held positions in the military and the bureaucracy. However, by the nineteenth century, marriages with the local population linked the ruling families to indigenous notables. At this time, many Turks also turned to commerce and the crafts, initially in the Souq el-Trouk (the Bazaar of the Turks), where a considerable number of merchants of Turkish ancestry emerged. The Turks also entered the corps of artisans. The Ben Romdhan family, of Turkish origin, claim much of the notable Tunisian families of Mahdia such as the Hamza, Turki, Gazdagli, Agha, and Snène families. Other prominent Tunisian families of Turkish origin include the Bayrams, Belkhodjas, El Materis, Sfars, Osmans, Mamis and the Slims.

- Ahmed Abdelkefi, economist
- Hassan Hosni Abdelwaheb, historian
- Mahmoud Aslan, writer
- Saloua Tarzi Ben Attia, politician
- Al-Husayn I ibn Ali at-Turki, founder of the Husainid Dynasty
- Mohamed Salah Baratli, resistant of the French occupation, opponent of President Bourguiba, human rights activist
- Ahmed Bayram, religious cleric
- M'hammed Bayram, religious cleric
- Mohamed Bayram V, intellectual
- Mohamed Taieb Bayram, religious cleric
- Ahmed Belkhodja, religious cleric
- Asma Belkhodja, pioneer of the Tunisian feminist movement
- M'hammed Belkhodja, politician
- Ali Bach Hamba, journalist and politician
- Mohamed Bach Hamba, writer
- Mahmoud Ben Mahmoud, filmmaker
- Yasemin Besson, wife of Éric Besson
- Hassen Bouhajeb, doctor
- Mahmoud Bourguiba, journalist
- Ahmed Chérif, doctor
- Béchir Dinguizli, doctor
- Mustapha Dinguizli, politician
- Ali Douagi, literary and cultural icon
- Abderrahman Dziri, medical researcher
- Mustafa Elkatipzade, Fenerbahçe football manager
- Nazli Fadhel, pioneer of the Tunisian feminist movement
- Sadok Ghileb, politician
- Fadhila Khetmi, theatre director
- Afef Jnifen, model and actress
- Mohamed Lahbib, pioneer of theater and television in Tunisia
- Mahmoud El Materi, physician and politician
- Moncef El Materi, former soldier and businessman
- Sakher El Materi, businessman
- Tahar El Materi, businessman
- Habib Osman, photographer
- Mustapha Osman, artist
- Chafia Rochdi, singer and actress
- Hichem Rostom, actor
- Mourad Salem, artist
- Rachid Sfar, former prime minister
- Mongi Slim, nationalist leader and Minister
- Mustapha Kamel Tarzi, diplomat
- Najiya Thamir, writer and radio producer
- Habib Turki, Secretary General of the IRU
- Hedi Turki, painter
- Yahia Turki, painter
- Zoubeir Turki, painter
- Abdeljelil Zaouche, Minister of Justice (1936–1943)
- Sadok Zmerli, professor

== See also ==
- Kouloughlis
- History of Ottoman-era Tunisia
- Tunisia-Turkey relations
- Turkish minorities in the former Ottoman Empire
  - Turks in the Arab world
  - Turks in Algeria
  - Turks in Libya

== Bibliography ==
- Abun-Nasr, Jamil M. (1982), "The Tunisian state in the eighteenth century", Revue de l'Occident musulman et de la Méditerranée, 33: 33–66, doi:10.3406/remmm.1982.1939
- Akar, Metin (1993), "Fas Arapçasında Osmanlı Türkçesinden Alınmış Kelimeler", Türklük Araştırmaları Dergisi, 7: 91–110
- Bidwell, Robin (2012), Dictionary Of Modern Arab History, Routledge, ISBN 978-1136162985.
- Brett, Michael; Fentress, Elizabeth (1997), The Berbers, Wiley-Blackwell, ISBN 0631207678.
- Brunschvig, Robert (1965), "Justice religieuse et justice laïque dans la Tunisie des Deys et des Beys: jusqu'au milieu du XIXesiècle", Studia Islamica, 23, Maisonneuve & Larose: 27–70, doi:10.2307/1595254, JSTOR 1595254
- Déjeux, Jean (1984), Dictionnaire des Auteurs Maghrébins de Langue Française, KARTHALA Editions, ISBN 2865370852.
- Derrick, Jonathan (2008), Africa's "Agitators": Militant Anti-colonialism in Africa and the West, 1918-1939, Columbia University Press, ISBN 978-0231700566.
- Ferchiou, Sophie (2001), Femme, Culture et Créativité en Tunisie, CREDIF, ISBN 9973931378.
- Ferté, Patric; Barrera, Caroline (2010), Etudiants de l'exil : Migrations internationales et universités refuges (XVIe-XXe siècle), Presses Universitaires du Mirail, ISBN 978-2810700103.
- Granara, William (2010), "Ali al-Du'aji (1909-1949)", in Allen, Roger (ed.), Essays in Arabic Literary Biography: 1850-1950, Otto Harrassowitz Verlag, ISBN 978-3447061414.
- Green, Arnold H. (1978), The Tunisian Ulama 1873-1915: Social Structure and Response to Ideological Currents, BRILL, ISBN 9004056874.
- Hizmetli, Sabri (1953), "Osmanlı Yönetimi Döneminde Tunus ve Cezayir'in Eğitim ve Kültür Tarihine Genel Bir Bakış" (PDF), Ankara Üniversitesi İlahiyat Fakültesi Dergisi, 32: 1–12
- Hourani, Albert; Ruthven, Malise (2002), A History of the Arab Peoples, Harvard University Press, ISBN 0674010175.
- Jacobs, Daniel; Morris, Peter (2002), The Rough Guide to Tunisia, Rough Guides, ISBN 1858287480.
- Khouaja, Ahmed (1962), "La biographie familiale comme source de connaissance historique : Le cas de la famille Ben Romdhan de Mahdia (Sahel tunisien) à l'époque coloniale et post-colonial", La pensée sauvage, C.L. Strauss.
- Özdemir, Hikmet (1990), "Tunus ve Civarında Yaşayan Türkçemiz", Türk Dünyası Araştırmaları, 18 (64): 153–168
- Smida, Mongi (1971), Khereddine: Ministre Réformateur, 1873-1877, Maison Tunisenne de l'Édition.
- Puaux, Gabriel (1954), "Essai de psychanalyse des protectorats nord-africains" (PDF), Politique étrangère, 1 (19): 11–28, doi:10.3406/polit.1954.2634
- UNESCO (2009), Diversité culturelle et dialogue interculturel en Tunisie, Commission nationale tunisienne pour l'éducation
