= Banque Zitouna =

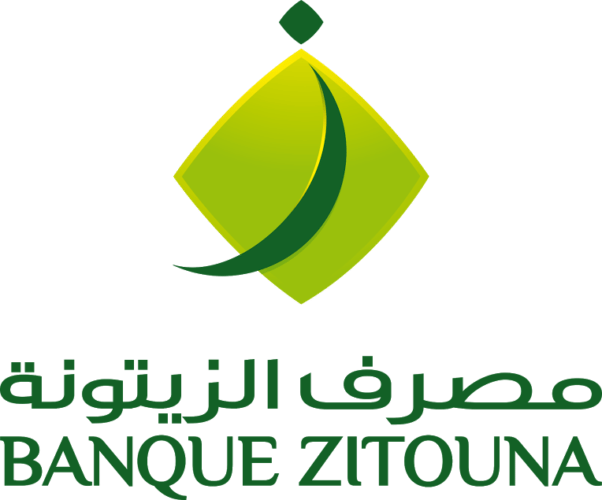
- Company type: Islamic banking
- Founded: 2009
- Founder: Mohamed Sakher El Materi
- Headquarters: Tunis, Tunisia

Banque Zitouna is the first Islamic bank in Tunisia and the Maghreb region (North Africa) with the capital of $30 million, aiming at developing Islamic loan and saving products for businesses and individuals.

Banque Zitouna was established in 2009 by the Tunisian businessman, Mohamed Sakher El Materi, Chairman of Princesse El Materi Holdings.

The Islamic Bank of Zitouna plans to grow by 20 branches per year and hopes to expand from Tunisia into neighbouring countries."
