= Belkhodja =

Belkhodja is a surname. Notable people with the surname include:

- Asma Belkhodja (1930–2011), Tunisian feminist
- Catherine Belkhodja (born 1955), French artist, actress and film director
- Hassen Belkhodja (1916–1981), Tunisian politician and businessman
- Jeanine Belkhodja (1928–2013), Algerian doctor and activist
- Néjib Belkhodja (1933– 2007), Tunisian painter
- Slim Belkhodja (born 1962), Tunisian chess Grandmaster
