= Andrew Murray Watson =

Economic historian

Andrew M. Watson

Andrew Murray Watson (1930 – 4 April 2024) was a scholar of economic history. He was known especially for his 1974 paper "The Arab Agricultural Revolution and Its Diffusion, 700–1100", which argued that progress in agriculture in the medieval Islamic world constituted a major economic transformation.

== Early life and education ==
Andrew Murray Watson was born in 1930, son of Amy Reid and Daniel Watson. He was educated at Trinity College, University of Toronto, Canada, earning his bachelor of commerce degree in 1952 and a master's degree in 1953. He then won a Rhodes Scholarship to the University of Oxford. After further studies at the University of Paris and the University of Cairo, in 1957 he joined the faculty of the University of Toronto.

== Career ==
In 1974, Watson published "The Arab Agricultural Revolution and Its Diffusion, 700–1100", a paper which argued that progress in agriculture in the medieval Islamic world constituted a major economic transformation, with the diffusion of multiple crops and innovations in agricultural practice. He developed the paper's thesis into his 1983 book Agricultural Innovation in the Early Islamic World: The Diffusion of Crops and Farming Techniques, 700–1100, published by Cambridge University Press. Both works have been cited many times over the subsequent 50 years. In 2024, the historian Paolo Squatriti described Watson's legacy as " immense and growing, in the fields of medieval history, agrarian history, Mediterranean history, and even in postclassical archaeobotany".

Watson retired in 1995 but continued teaching for ten years after that, and wrote a chapter on agriculture for The New Cambridge History of Islam in 2010. He died on 4 April 2024, aged 93.

== Memorials ==
In 2009, scholars, friends, and students of Watson from across the Western world and the Middle East produced a festschrift with 11 essays in his honour, edited by Brian A. Catlos.
