= Adwya =

Tunisian pharmaceutical company

- Native name: أدوية
- Type: Société Anonyme
- Industry: Pharmaceutical industry
- Founded: June 25, 1983; 43 years ago
- Founders: Moncef El Materi and Tahar El Materi
- Headquarters: La Marsa, Tunisia
- Area served: Tunisia
- Products: Pharmaceutical products for medical and veterinary use
- Website: adwya.com.tn

Adwya is a Tunisian company that specializes in the production of pharmaceutical products for medical and veterinary use. It is one of Tunisia's largest private pharmaceutical companies. Adwya's product range spans several medical disciplines, including cardiology, dermatology, neuropsychiatry and urology.

== History ==
The company was established in 1983 by Moncef El Materi and Tahar El Materi.

=== Market share ===
According to the Oxford Business Group, in 2008, with a total market share of 5.5%, Adwya was ranked second after Societe des Industries Pharamacutiques de Tunisie in sales turnover in hospitals, clinics and pharmacies. On the officinal market it supplied doctors and pharmacies with an 8.4% market share. The export market represented only a marginal part of its activity, at 0.4%, and Libya was the only country to which it exported to.

Adwya released its activity indicators for the year 2012 reporting that sales reached 67.15 million dinars at the end of 2012 against 55.05 million dinars for the same period in 2011, an overall growth of 22%. In addition, the company noted an increase in export sales up 57%, reaching 568 thousand dinars in 2012 against 362,000 dinars in 2011.
