= Aemilius Macer =

Roman didactic poet

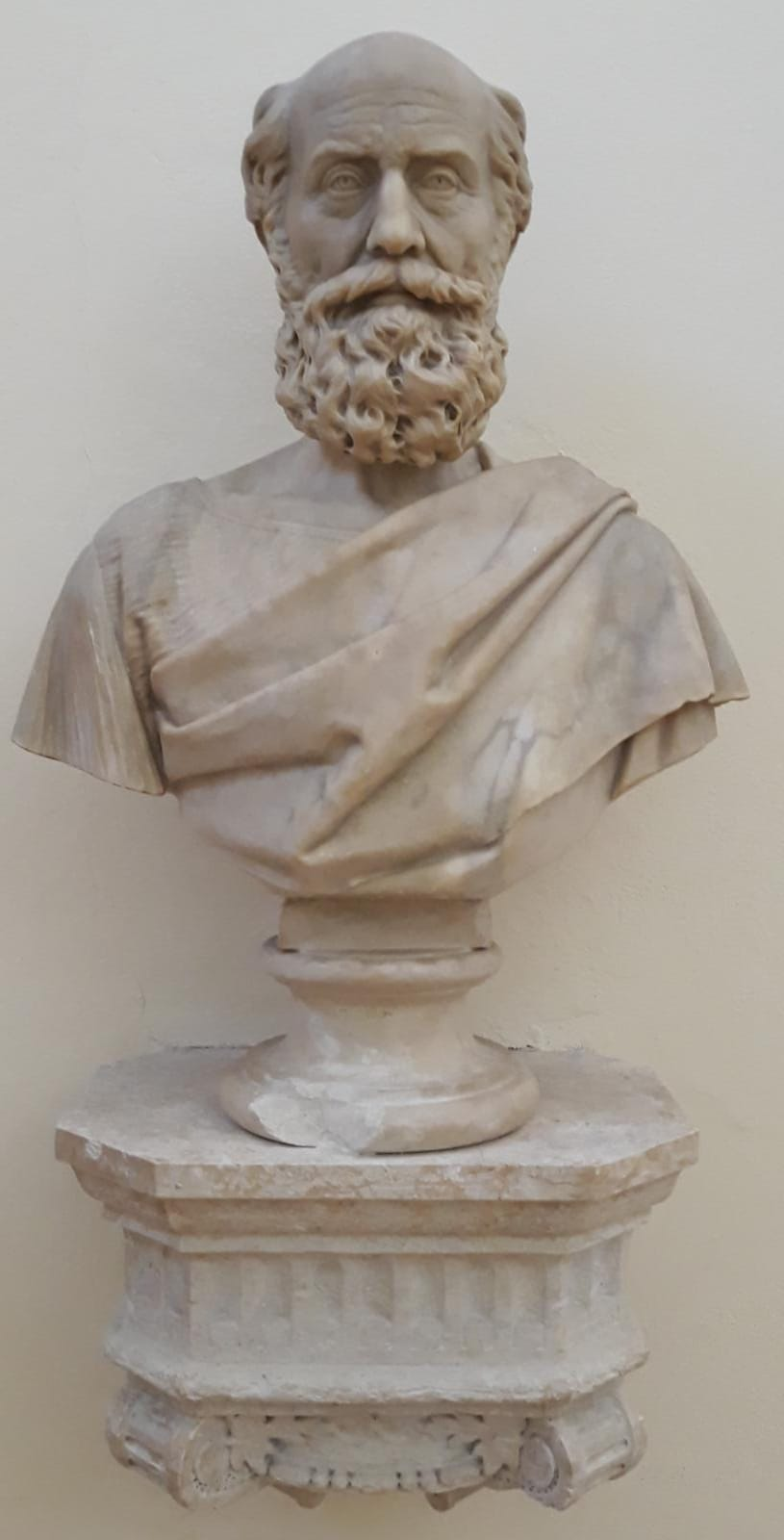
Bust of Aemilius Macer

Aemilius Macer of Verona was a Roman didactic poet. He authored two poems, one on birds (Ornithogonia), a translation of a work by Boios, and the other on the antidotes against the poison of serpents (Theriaca), which he imitated from the Greek poet Nicander of Colophon. According to Jerome, he died in 16 BC. It is possible that he wrote also a botanical work. The extant hexameter poem known as Floridus or De viribus (aut virtutibus) herbarum, traditionally ascribed to Macer, is actually a medieval production by Odo Magdunensis, a French physician.

Aemilius Macer must be distinguished from the Macer called Iliacus in the Ovidian catalogue of poets, the author of an epic poem on the events preceding the opening of the Iliad. The fact of his being addressed by Ovid in one of the epistles Ex Ponto shows that he was alive long after Aemilius Macer. He has been identified with the son or grandson of Theophanes of Mytilene, the intimate friend of Pompey.
