= Tunisia–Turkey relations =

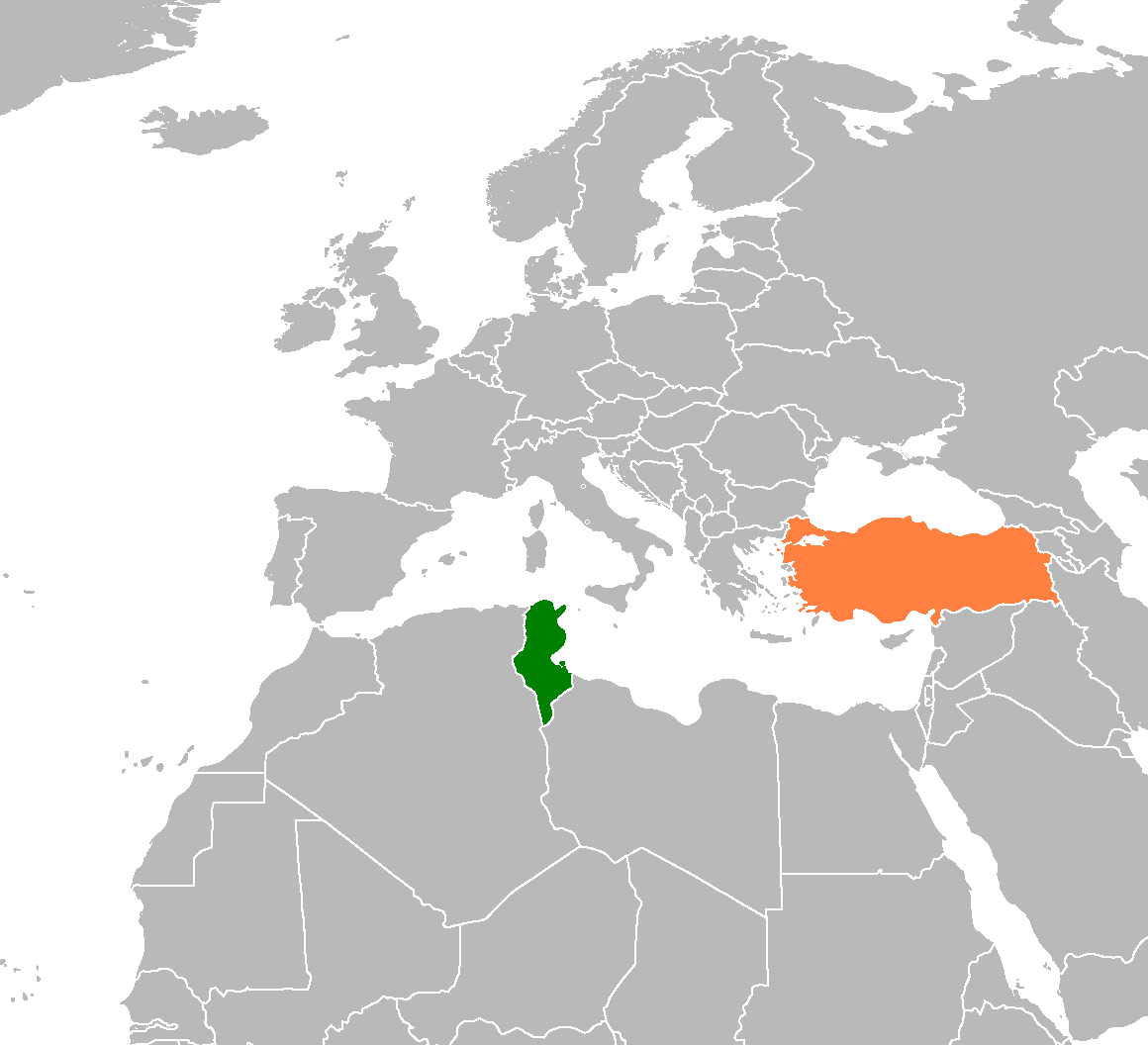
- Tunisia: Turkey

Diplomatic mission
- Tunisian embassy, Ankara: Turkish embassy, Tunis

Tunisia–Turkey relations are foreign relations between Tunisia and Turkey. Tunisia has an embassy in Ankara and a consulate-general in Istanbul. Turkey has an embassy in Tunis. Both countries are members of the Organisation of Islamic Cooperation, Union for the Mediterranean and United Nations. Turkey is one of Tunisia's most important partners in trade and relations are strong based on religious and historical values.

== History ==
Tunisia was under the rule of the Ottoman Empire for over 300 years, until Tunisia was under French control. The diplomatic relations between Turkey and Tunisia were established in 1956, just after Tunisia gained its independence. Both countries are full members of the Union for the Mediterranean. The countries have had strong ethnic and cultural ties since the Ottoman colonization of Tunisia starting in the early 16th century. Both countries signed The Treaty of Friendship and Cooperation on 15 September 2011. Turkey helped Tunisia after the Jasmine Revolution with financial and technical aid. Tunisia and Turkey have good economic ties. Many Tunisian merchants buy clothing (mostly) and other goods from Turkey. Also, Turkey is a very popular tourist destination for Tunisians. Citizens of both countries can travel visa-free between each other. Turkey and Tunisia are allies under the Major non-NATO ally agreement.

On 25 December 2012, a joint declaration on the establishment High Level Strategic Cooperation Council (HLSCC) between Turkey and Tunisia was signed in Ankara by Prime Ministers of both countries. With this political declaration, the two countries laid the legal foundation for a closer bilateral cooperation mechanism and agreed to cooperate in the fields of politics, security, military, economy, science, technology and trade.

== See also ==
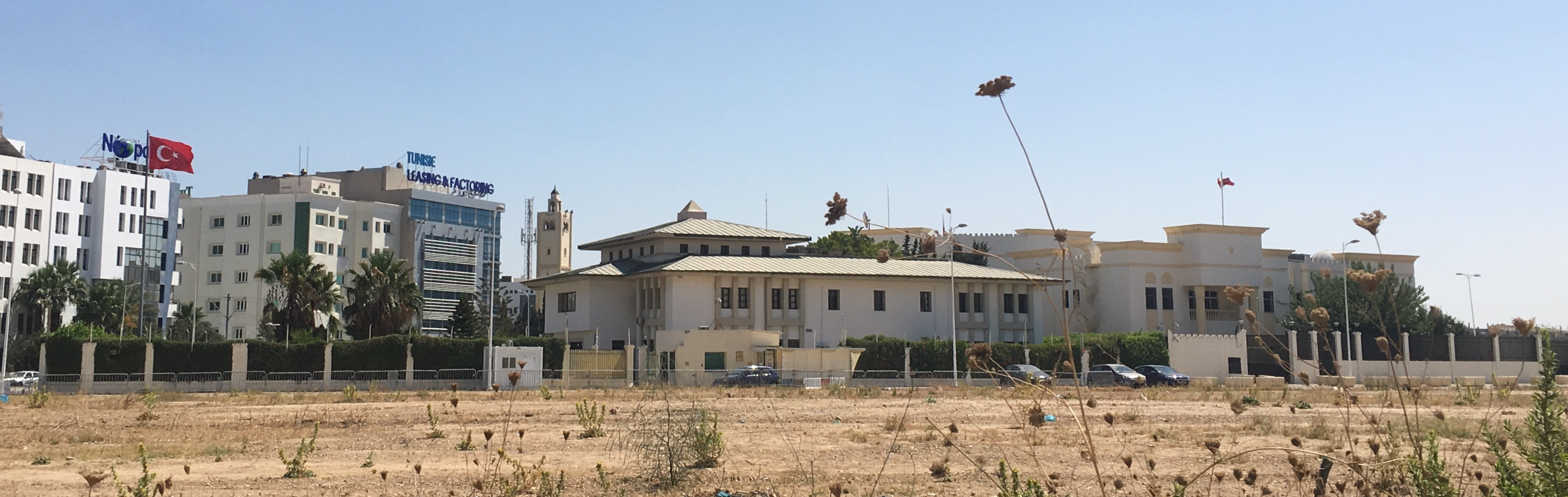
Embassy of Turkey in Tunis

- Turks in Tunisia
- Foreign relations of Tunisia
- Foreign relations of Turkey
