= Princesse El Materi Holdings =

Princesse El Materi Holding was a company created by the Tunisian businessman Sakher El Materi, the son-in-law of Zine El Abidine Ben Ali, who was President of Tunisia until 2011. Princesse El Materi Holdings used nepotism and improper money to acquire illegitimate businesses.

Under Ben Ali's rule, the company become one of the largest conglomerates in Tunisia. It actively held companies in six different industry sectors, including News and Media, Banking and Financial Services, Automotive, Shipping and Cruises, Real Estate and Agriculture. On November 22, 2010, the group also diversified into the Telecommunication industry.

== History ==
Princesse El Materi Holding’s first acquisition was the company Ennakl, the importer of Volkswagen to Tunisia, for a reputed 22 million dinars. Shortly after, he started an all-round modernization of the company with an aggressive marketing campaign and heavy investment. The car dealership, which was previously in very poor condition, has since become, as of 2007, the second largest importer of Volkswagen vehicles into Africa. The company has started the marketing of new brands such as Audi, Porsche and Seat, positioning itself as the largest provider of commercial and passenger vehicles to the Tunisian market, with a turnover of more than 300 million dinars, roughly the equivalent of EUR 250 million. The company successfully launched a dual listing public offering to both the Tunisian and Moroccan Stock Exchange. The dual listing was a pioneering moment in the history of Tunisian companies, it is the first Tunisian company listed on more than one exchange.

With the success of Ennakl, Princesse El Materi Holdings announced the intention to import the Korean ‘Kia’ brand and has opened ‘City Car Kia Motors’ as a vehicle for the imports.

Princesse El Materi Holdings further entered the Cruiseline industry with ‘Goulette Shipping Cruises (SAG)’. The company opened the expanded port of Tunis: La Goulette, a terminal for cruise passengers. The expansion of the port and construction of the passenger terminal is reported to have cost 80 million dinars. Princess Holding has two other companies closely linked to the activities of SAG: Goulette Shipping Services maintains cruise ships and Cruise Tours agency organizes tours for cruise passengers.

In a move to continue the diversity of its holdings and further support the Tunisian economy, Princesse El Materi Holdings acquired a 70% majority share in the capital of “Dar Assabah”, a Tunisian press, printing, publishing, distribution and advertising company. Following the deal, Sakher El Materi, president of the company, said that “at a time when throughout the world, the press, are forced to merge to survive, I am here to give the group Assabah- Le Temps, the means of its ambitions“. El Materi added that his goal was to contribute to the quest for the truth and to contribute to the democratic climate in Tunisia. He stressed that his aim was to contribute to the Tunisian pluralistic media landscape with a stronger “Assabah-Le Temps Group, keen on innovation, more open to youth and more focused on issues of our time”.

In September 2007, Princesse El Materi Holdings launched the first Islamic private radio station: Zitouna FM (Zitouna is the name of a prestigious Mosque in Tunis), which broadcasts 24 hours a day and covers the entire territory of Tunisia. The station's deputy director Mohamed Machfar outlines the vision for the station: “the correct understanding and discussion of the Qur'an is the main subject of Radio Zitouna".

In January 2009 Princesse El Materi Holdings started its second business promoting the business sense of Islamic values. Said to be its most ambitious project yet, the group obtained the approval of the Tunisian monetary authorities to create Banque Zitouna the Islamic commercial bank specializing in Islamic finance (marketing of financial products respectful of the Sharia ). With a capital of 30 million dinars, its formation was announced by a publication in the Official Gazette of the Republic of Tunisia on 10 September 2009. Zitouna Bank, whose Arabic name is in reference to the olive tree, will provide services to individual customers, Tunisian and international enterprises and investors, as much as it will contribute to the country’s development effort. Simultaneously the group is opening an insurance company carrying similar branding of: Zitouna Takafoul. Zitouna Bank was officially inaugurated on May 28, 2010.

In recognition of the success of the label Zitouna, The group entered the Agricultural industry by planting olive trees on a plot of 1,200 hectares. The project will introduce new varieties of olive never planted in Tunisia and will rely on new technologies in all phases of production.

On November 22, 2010, the group released a press statement that it has agreed to buy, along with Qatar Telecom QSC, Orascom Telecom Holding’s 50 percent stake in Tunisiana for $1.2 billion.
