= Tahar El Materi =

Tunisian businessman (1932–2021)

Tahar El Materi (1932 – 5 November 2021) was a Tunisian businessman. Born in 1932, he established Al Adwya, one of Tunisia’s biggest private pharmaceutical companies, with his brother Moncef El Materi in the 1984s. He died on 5 November 2021, at the age of 89.
