= Arab Agricultural Revolution =

Arab transformation of agriculture in medieval Spain

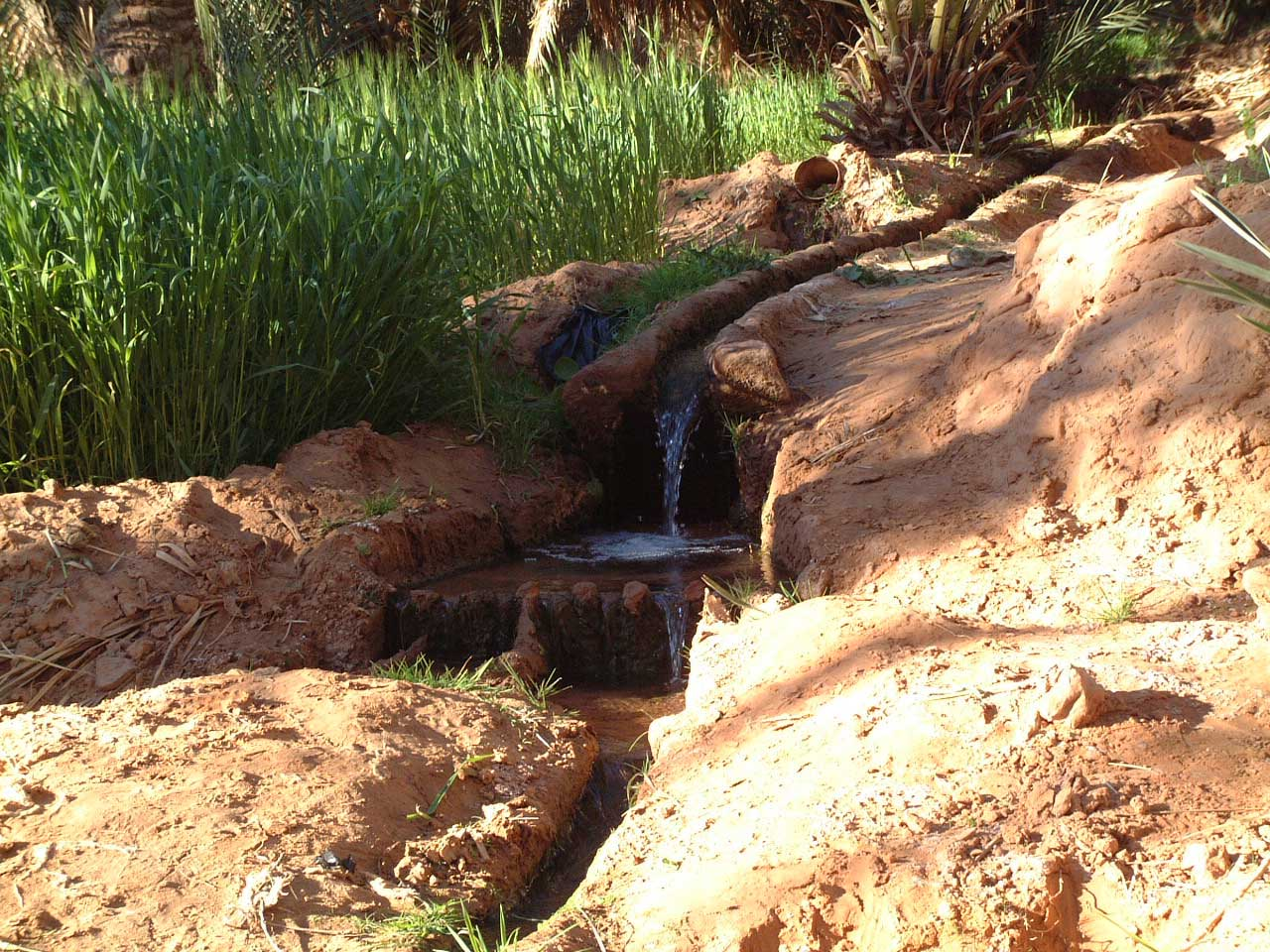
The Arabs transformed agriculture during the Islamic Golden Age by spreading major crops and techniques such as irrigation across the Old World.

The Arab Agricultural Revolution (Note: The Arab Agricultural Revolution has also variously been called the Medieval Green Revolution, the Muslim Agricultural Revolution, the Islamic Agricultural Revolution and the Islamic Green Revolution.) was the transformation in agriculture in the Old World during the Islamic Golden Age (8th to 13th centuries). The agronomic literature of the time, with major books by Ibn Bassal and Ibn al-'Awwam, demonstrates the extensive diffusion of useful plants to medieval Spain (al-Andalus), and the growth in Islamic scientific knowledge of agriculture and horticulture. Medieval Arab historians and geographers described al-Andalus as a fertile and prosperous region with abundant water, full of fruit from trees such as the olive and pomegranate. Archaeological evidence demonstrates improvements in animal husbandry and in irrigation such as with the saqiyah waterwheel. These changes made agriculture far more productive, supporting population growth, urbanisation, and increased stratification of society.

The revolution was first described by the historian Antonio Garcia Maceira in 1876. The name was coined by the historian Andrew Murray Watson in an influential but at the time controversial 1974 paper. However, by 2014 it had proven useful to historians, and had been supported by findings in archaeology and archaeobotany.

== Medieval history ==
=== Islamic agronomy ===
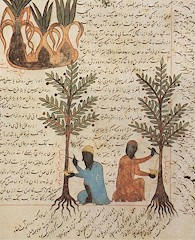
Medieval Islamic arboriculture: Ibn Bassal and Ibn al-'Awwam described in detail how to propagate and care for trees such as date and olive.

The first Arabic book on agronomy to reach al-Andalus, in the 10th century, was Ibn Wahshiyya's al-Filāḥa al-Nabaṭiyya (Nabatean Agriculture), from Iraq; it was followed by texts written in al-Andalus, such as the Mukhtasar kitab al-filaha (Abridged Book of Agriculture) by Al-Zahrawi (Abulcasis) from Cordoba, around 1000 AD.

The eleventh-century agronomist Ibn Bassal of Toledo described 177 species in his Dīwān al-filāha (The Court of Agriculture). Ibn Bassal had travelled widely across the Islamic world, returning with a detailed knowledge of agronomy. His practical and systematic book both gives detailed descriptions of useful plants including leaf and root vegetables, herbs, spices and trees, and explains how to propagate and care for them.

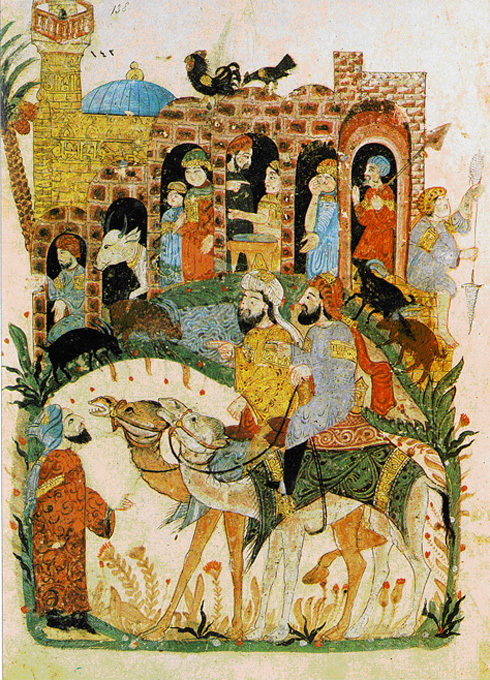
Village scene with poultry, sheep and goats from a copy of the Maqamat al-Hariri illustrated by al-Wasiti, 1237

The twelfth-century agronomist Ibn al-'Awwam described in detail in his Kitāb al-Filāha (Treatise on Agriculture) how olive trees should be grown, grafted (with an account of his own experiments), treated for disease, and harvested, and gave similar detail for crops such as cotton.

Medieval Islamic agronomists including Ibn Bassal and Ibn al-'Awwam described agricultural and horticultural techniques including how to propagate the olive and the date palm, crop rotation of flax with wheat or barley, and companion planting of grape and olive. These books demonstrate the importance of agriculture both as a traditional practice and as a scholarly science. In al-Andalus, there is evidence that the almanacs and manuals of agronomy helped to catalyse change, causing scholars to seek out new kinds of vegetable and fruit, and to carry out experiments in botany; in turn, these helped to improve actual practice in the region's agriculture. During the 11th century Abbadid dynasty in Seville, the sultan took a personal interest in fruit production, discovering from a peasant the method he had used to grow some exceptionally large melons—pinching off all but ten of the buds, and using wooden props to hold the stems off the ground.

=== Islamic animal husbandry ===
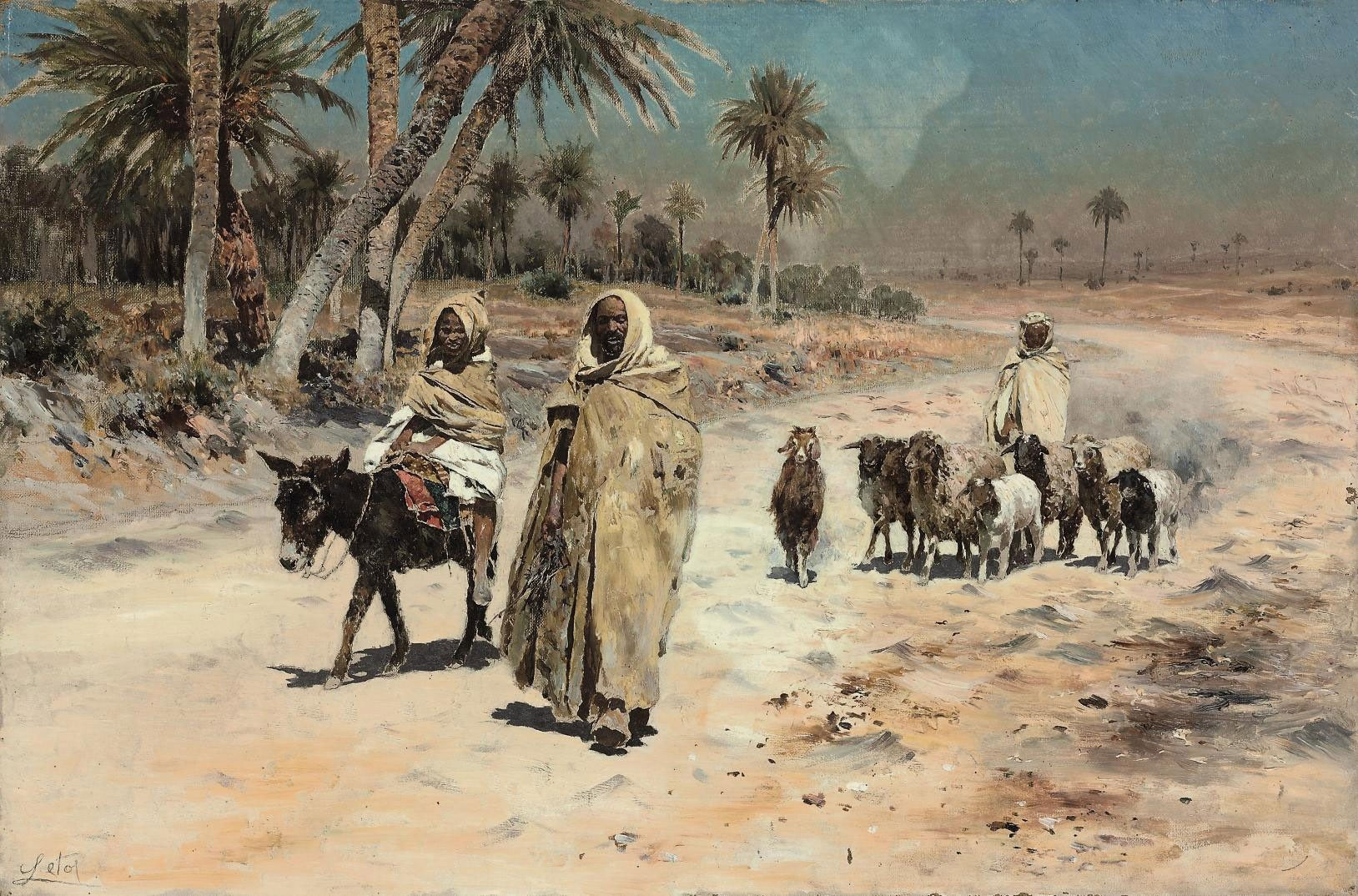
Arab sheep herders, by Antonio Leto

Archaeological evidence from the measurement of bones (osteometry) demonstrates that sheep in southern Portugal increased in size during the Islamic period, while cattle increased when the area became Christian after its reconquest. The archaeologist Simon Davis assumes that the change in size signifies improvement by animal husbandry, while in his view the choice of sheep is readily explained by the Islamic liking for mutton.

=== Islamic irrigation ===
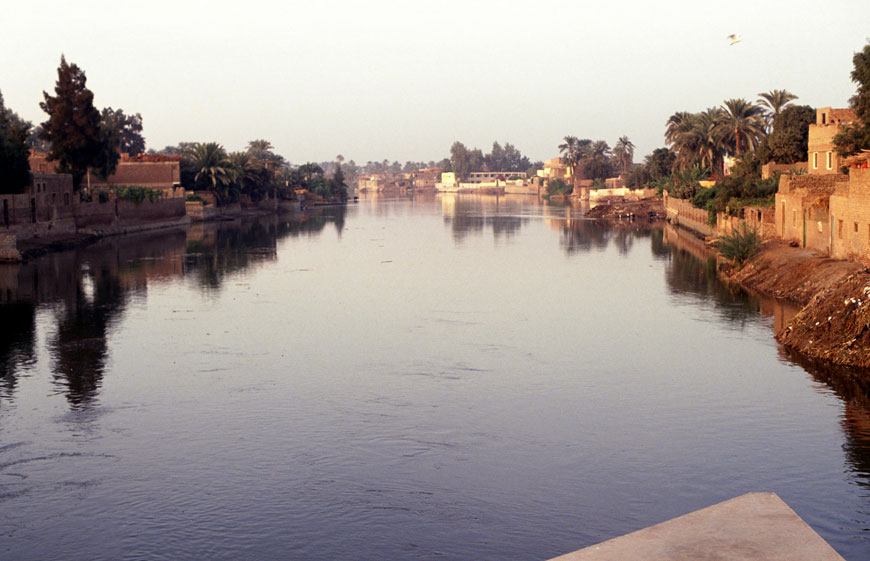
The ancient Bahr Yussef canal connects the Fayyum depression to the River Nile some 25 km away.

During the period, irrigated cultivation developed due to the growing use of animal power, water power and wind power. Windpumps were used to pump water since at least the 9th century in what is now Afghanistan, Iran and Pakistan.

The Islamic period in the Fayyum depression of Middle Egypt, like medieval Islamic Spain (al-Andalus), was characterised by extremely large-scale systems of irrigation, with both the supply, via gravity-fed canals, and the management of water under local tribal control. In the Islamic period in al-Andalus, whose rural parts were equally tribal, the irrigation canal network was much enlarged. Similarly, in the Fayyum, new villages were established in the period, and new water-dependent orchards and sugar plantations were developed.

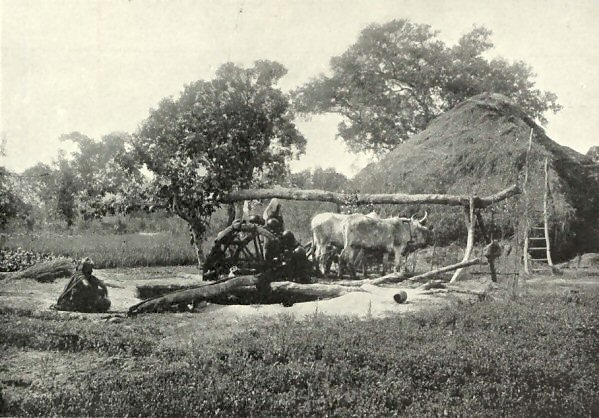
The animal-powered sakia irrigation wheel was improved in and diffused further from Islamic Spain.

The sakia (Note: Glick uses the term noria, but states that it is animal-powered, for which sakia is the more usual name.) or animal-powered irrigation wheel was likely introduced to Islamic Spain in early Umayyad times (in the 8th century). Improvements to it were described by Hispano-Arabic agronomists in the 11th and 12th centuries. From there, sakia irrigation was spread further around Spain and Morocco. A 13th-century observer claimed there were "5000" waterwheels along the Guadalquivir in Islamic Spain; even allowing for medieval exaggeration, irrigation systems were certainly extensive in the region at that time. The supply of water was sufficient for cities as well as agriculture: the Roman aqueduct network into the city of Cordoba was repaired in the Umayyad period, and extended.

=== Early accounts of Islamic Spain ===
Medieval Andalusian historians such as Ibn Bassam, Ibn Hayyan, and Ibn Hazm, and geographers such as al-Bakri, al-Idrisi, and al-Zuhri, described Islamic Spain as a fortunate entity. Indeed, the tenth-century Jewish scribe Menahem Ben Saruq wrote to the Khazar king "The name of our land in which we dwell ... in the language of the Arabs, the inhabitants of the land, al-Andalus ... the land is rich, abounding in rivers, springs, and aqueducts; a land of corn, oil, and wine, of fruits and all manner of delicacies; it has pleasure-gardens and orchards, fruitful trees of every kind, including ... [the white mulberry] upon which the silkworm feeds". al-Maqqari, quoting the ninth-century Ahmad ibn Muhammad ibn Musa al-Razi, describes al-Andalus as a rich land "with good, arable soil, fertile settlements, flowing copiously with plentiful rivers and fresh springs." Al-Andalus was associated with cultivated trees like olive and pomegranate. After the Christian reconquest, arable farming was frequently abandoned, the land reverting to pasture, though some farmers tried to adopt Islamic agronomy. Western historians have wondered if the Medieval Arab historians were reliable, given that they had a motive to emphasize the splendour of al-Andalus, but evidence from archaeology has broadly supported their claims.

== Scholarly debate ==
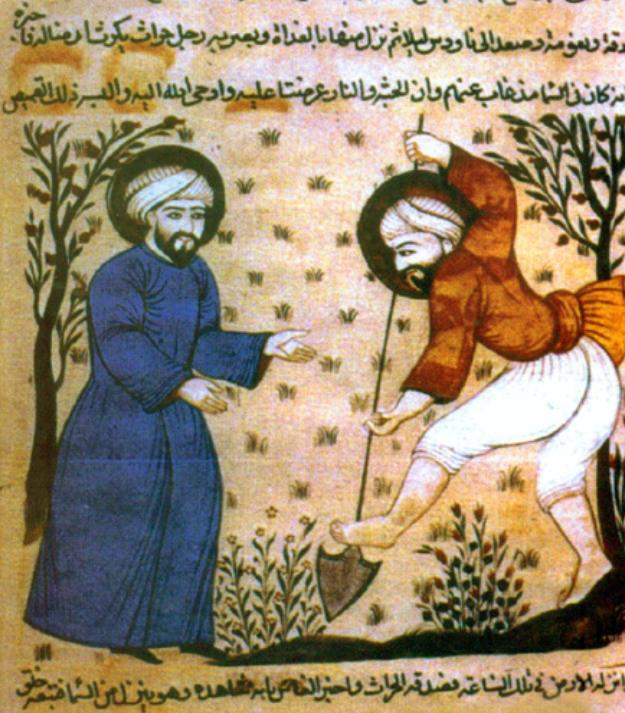
Agricultural scene from a mediaeval Arabic manuscript from al-Andalus (Islamic Spain), c. 1200

In 1876, the historian Antonio García Maceira argued that where the Romans and then the Goths who farmed in Spain made little effort to improve their crops or to import species from other regions, under "the Arabs", there was an agricultural "revolution" in al-Andalus caused "by implementing the knowledge that they acquired through observation during their peregrinations, (Note: However "mythical" the idea of the wandering Arab, Ibn Bassal was indeed widely travelled and wrote from his own observations.) and the result was extensive agricultural settlement."

In 1974, the historian Andrew Watson published a paper proposing an extension of Garcia Maceira's hypothesis of agricultural revolution in Al-Andalus. (Note: In Paolo Squatriti's view, Watson's thesis also recalled the Belgian economic historian Henri Pirenne's 1939 view of the way that a seventh century Islamic maritime power in the Mediterranean had prevented Europe from trading there.) Watson argued that the economy established by Arab and other Muslim traders across the Old World enabled the diffusion of many crops and farming techniques throughout the Islamic world, as well as the adaptation of crops and techniques from and to regions outside it. Crops from Africa, such as sorghum, from China, such as citrus fruits, and from India, such as mango, rice, cotton and sugar cane, were distributed throughout Islamic lands, which he believed had not previously grown these plants. He listed eighteen such crops. (Note: Decker wrote: "In support of his thesis, Watson charted the advance of seventeen food crops and one fiber crop that became important over a large area of the Mediterranean world during the first four centuries of Islamic rule (roughly the seventh through eleventh centuries C.E.)" The food crops named by Watson were rice, sorghum, durum wheat, sugar cane, watermelon, aubergine (eggplant), spinach, artichoke, taro, sour orange, lemon, lime, banana, plantain, mango, and coconut; the fibre was cotton.) Watson suggested that these introductions, along with an increased mechanization of agriculture and irrigation, led to major changes in economy, population distribution, vegetation cover, agricultural production and income, population, urban growth, distribution of the labour force, industries linked to agriculture, cooking, diet and clothing in the Islamic world.

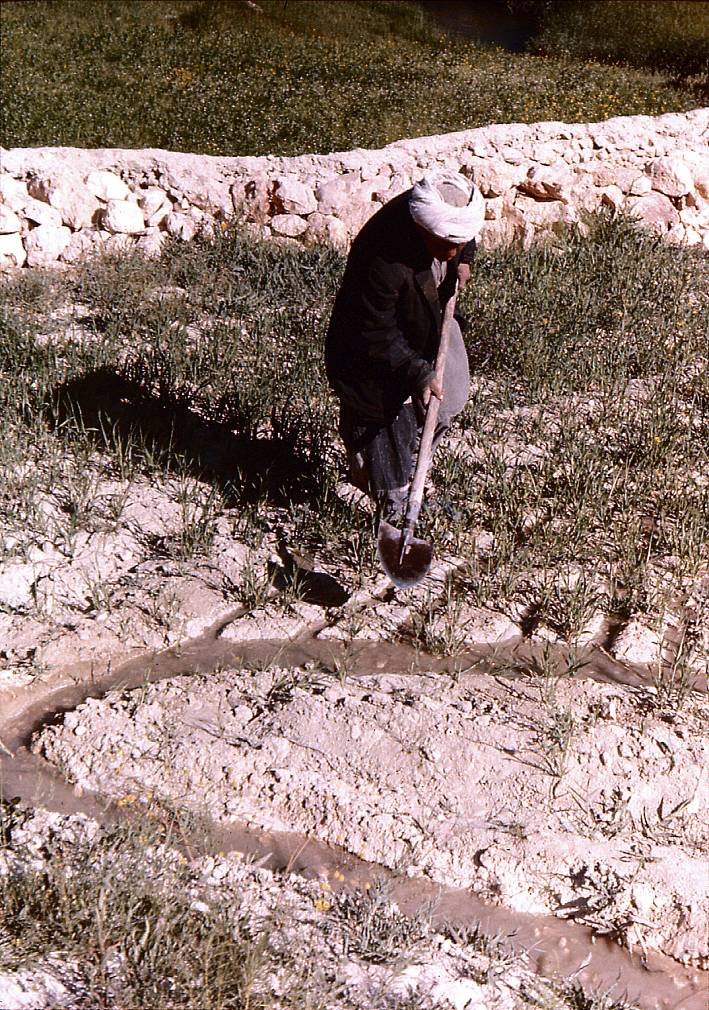
Irrigating by hand in the 20th century

In 1997, the historian of science Howard R. Turner wrote that Islamic study of soil, climate, seasons and ecology "promoted a remarkably advanced horticulture and agriculture. The resulting knowledge, transmitted to Europe after the eleventh century, helped to improve farming techniques, widen the variety of crops, and increase yields on the continent's farmlands. In addition, an enormous variety of crops was introduced to the West from or through Muslim lands".

In 2006, James E. McClellan III and Harold Dorn stated in their book Science and Technology in World History that Islam had depended as much on its farmers as its soldiers, and that the farmers had helped to create a "scientific civilisation": "in what amounted to an agricultural revolution they adapted new and more diversified food crops to the Mediterranean ecosystem: rice, sugar cane, cotton, melons, citrus fruits, and other products. With rebuilt and enlarged systems of irrigation, Islamic farming extended the growing season and increased productivity." They stated further that the importance of these efforts was indicated by the "uninterrupted series" of books on agriculture and irrigation; another indication was provided by the many books on particular animals of importance to Islamic farming and government, including horses and bees. They ascribed the population growth, urbanisation, social stratification, centralisation of politics and state-controlled scholarship to the improvement in agricultural productivity.

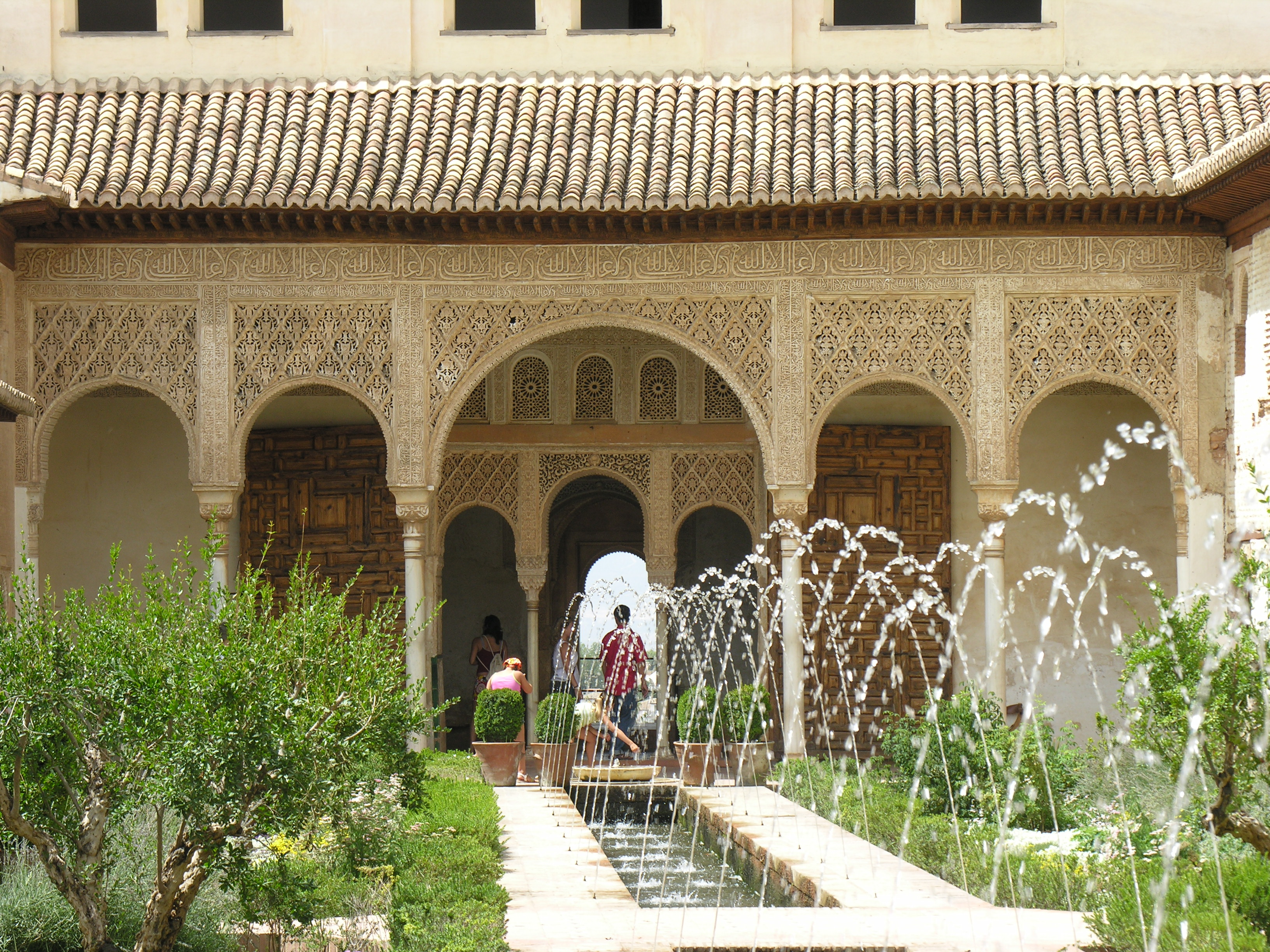
Islamic Golden Age innovation: the Moors brought a new architecture, including gardens with water engineering, as in the Alhambra's Generalife Palace, to Al-Andalus.

By 2008, the archaeozoologist Simon Davis could write without qualification that in the Iberian peninsula "Agriculture flourished: the Moslems introduced new irrigation techniques and new plants like sugar cane, rice, cotton, spinach, pomegranates and citrus trees, to name just a few... Seville had become a Mecca for agronomists, and its hinterland, or Aljarafe, their laboratory."

In 2011, the Arabist Paulina B. Lewicka wrote that in Medieval Egypt, the Arab Agricultural Revolution was followed by a "commercial revolution" as the Fatimids (in power 909–1171) made Egypt a major trade centre for the Mediterranean and the Indian Ocean, and in the more cosmopolitan and sophisticated society that resulted, a "culinary revolution" which transformed Egyptian cuisine.

=== Early scepticism ===
Watson's work was met with some early scepticism, such as from the historian Jeremy Johns in 1984. Johns argued that Watson's selection of 18 plants was "peculiar", since the banana, coconut, mango and pomelo were unimportant in the Islamic region at the time, detracting from the discussion of the staple crops. Johns further noted that the evidence of diffusion of crops was imperfect, that Watson made "too many minor slips and larger errors" such as getting dates wrong or claiming that a 1439 document was Norman, and had failed to make best use of the evidence that was available, such as of the decline of classical agriculture, or even to mention the changing geomorphology. Johns however concluded that "The hypothesis of an 'Abbasid agricultural revolution is challenging and may well prove useful".

The historian Eliyahu Ashtor wrote in 1976 that agricultural production declined in the period immediately after the Arab conquest in areas of Mesopotamia and Egypt, on the limited basis of records of taxes collected on cultivated areas. In a 2012 paper focusing on the Sawād area of Iraq, Michele Campopiano concluded that Iraqi agricultural output declined in the 7th to 10th century; he attributed this decline to "competition of the different ruling groups to gain access to land surplus".

=== Diffusion not revolution ===
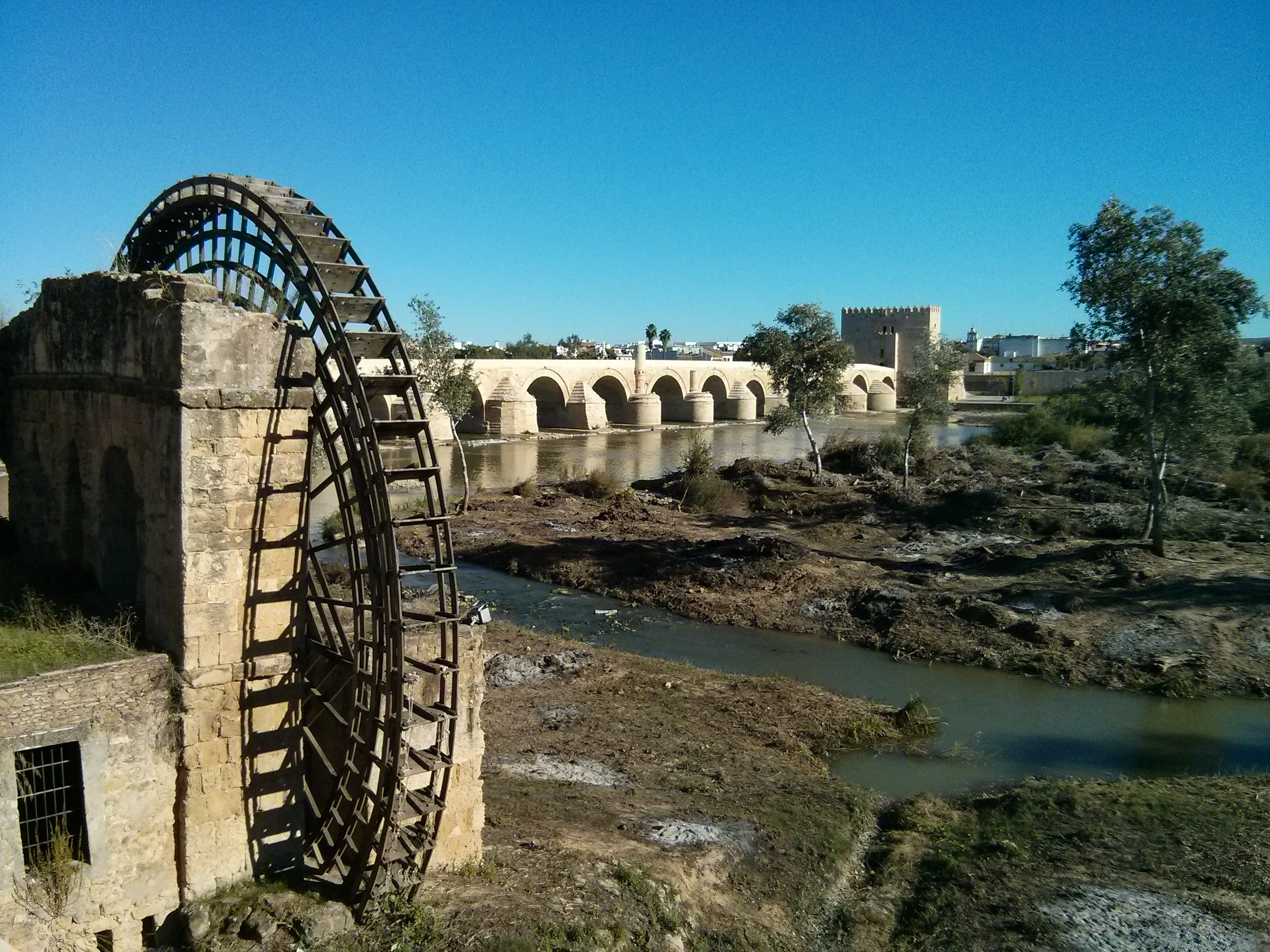
Roman and Islamic systems: the Albolafia irrigation water wheel in front of the Roman bridge at Córdoba, Spain (Note: The website 'Alcazar of the Christian Monarchs' explains: "The most plausible hypothesis points to an Almoravid construction from 1136-1137. The structure was later reused in the Almohad period to supply the lower part of the Alcazaba with water. The watermill was operational up until the end of the fifteenth century, when, according to tradition, Queen Isabella the Catholic ordered it to be taken down because the noise it produced prevented her from sleeping.")

In 2009, the historian Michael Decker (Note: Decker wrote "Nothing has been written, however that attacks the central pillar of Watson's thesis, namely the 'basket' of plants that is inextricably linked to all other elements of his analysis. This work will therefore assess the place and importance of four crops of the 'Islamic Agricultural Revolution' for which there is considerable pre-Islamic evidence in the Mediterranean world.") stated that widespread cultivation and consumption of four staples, namely durum wheat, Asiatic rice, sorghum and cotton were already commonplace under the Roman Empire and Sassanid Empire, centuries before the Islamic period. He suggested that their actual role in Islamic agriculture had been exaggerated, arguing that the agricultural practices of Muslim cultivators did not fundamentally differ from those of pre-Islamic times, but evolved from the hydraulic know-how and 'basket' of agricultural plants inherited from their Roman and Persian predecessors. In the case of cotton, which the Romans grew mainly in Egypt, the plant remained a minor crop in the classical Islamic period: the major fibre was flax, as in Roman times. Decker further asserted that the advanced state of ancient irrigation practices "rebuts sizeable parts of the Watson thesis," since for example in Spain, archaeological work indicated that the Islamic irrigation system was developed from the existing Roman network, rather than replacing it. Decker agreed that "Muslims made an important contribution to world farming through the westward diffusion of some crops", but that the introduction of "agronomic techniques and materials" had been less widespread and less consistent than Watson had suggested. Furthermore, there is clear evidence that agricultural devices such as watermills and waterwheels, shadufs, norias, sakias, water screws and water pumps were widely known and applied in Greco-Roman agriculture long before the Muslim conquests.

=== Revolution driven by social institutions ===
The main trade of [Seville] is in [olive] oils which are exported to the east and the west by land and sea. These oils come from a district called al-Sharaf which extends for 40 milles and which is entirely planted with olives and figs. It reaches from Seville as far as Niébla, having a width of more than 12 milles. It comprises, it is said, eight thousand thriving villages, with a great number of baths and fine houses.

— Muhammad al-Idrisi, 12th century

D. Fairchild Ruggles rejected the view that the medieval Arab historians had been wrong to claim that agriculture had been revolutionised, and that it had instead simply been restored to a state like that before the collapse of the Western Roman Empire. She argued that while the medieval Arab historians may not have had a reliable picture of agricultural knowledge before their time, they were telling the truth about a dramatic change to the landscape of Islamic Spain. A whole new "system of crop rotation, fertilization, transplanting, grafting, and irrigation" was swiftly and systematically put into place under a new legal framework of land ownership and tenancy. In her view, therefore, there was indeed an agricultural revolution in al-Andalus, but it consisted principally of new social institutions rather than of new agronomic techniques. Ruggles stated that this "dramatic economic, scientific, and social transformation" began in al-Andalus and had spread throughout the Islamic Mediterranean by the 10th century.

=== Historiography ===
Looking back over 40 years of scholarship since Watson's theory, the historian of land use Paolo Squatriti (Note: Squatriti is known for works on medieval land use such as Landscape and Change in Early Medieval Italy, Cambridge University Press, 2013.) wrote in 2014 that the thesis had been widely used and cited by historians and archaeologists working in different fields. It had "proved to be applicable in scholarly debates about technological diffusion in pre-industrial societies, the 'decline' of Islamic civilization, the relations between elite and peasant cultural systems, Europe's historical Sonderweg in the second millennium CE, the origins of globalization, [and] the nature of Mediterraneity." Squatriti noted that Watson had originally trained in economics, and applied this interest to his historical studies. Squatriti described Watson's paper as concise and elegant, and popular for its usefulness in supporting the theses of many different historians. He observed that Watson's thesis did not depend on claims of new introductions of plants into any region, but of their "diffusion and normalization", i.e. of their becoming widely and generally used, even if they were known from Roman times. Calling Watson's "philological" approach "old fashioned", and given that Watson had worked "virtually without archaeology", Squatrini expressed surprise that recent research in archaeobotany had failed to "decisively undermine" Watson's thesis.

== See also ==
- Columbian exchange

== Sources ==
- Ashtor, E. (1976). A Social and Economic History of the Near East in the Middle Ages. Berkeley: University of California Press.
- Baggott, Kate (11 April 2024). "Seeds of Time: In Memory of Professor Emeritus Andrew Murray Watson". Department of Economics, University of Toronto.
- Bolens, L. (December 1972). "L'Eau et l'irrigation d'après les traités d'agronomie Andalous au Moyen Age (XI-XIIèmes siècles)". Options Méditerranéenes (in French). 16: 65–77.
- Brebbia, C. A. (2017). "Tajo, Jarama, and Guadalquivir rivers (Spain): court and city—recreational and industrial aspects of the rivers' course". Water and Society IV. WIT Press. pp. 335–346. ISBN 978-1-78466-185-4.
- Burke, Edmund (June 2009). "Islam at the Center: Technological Complexes and the Roots of Modernity". Journal of World History. 20 (2). University of Hawaii Press: 165–86. doi:10.1353/jwh.0.0045. S2CID 143484233.
- Cahen, C. (1986). "Review of Agricultural Innovation in the Early Islamic World, by Andrew Watson". Journal of the Social and Economic History of the Orient. 29 (2): 217–218. doi:10.2307/3631792. JSTOR 3631792.
- Campopiano, Michele (2012). "State, Land Tax and Agriculture in Iraq from the Arab Conquest to the Crisis of the Abbasid Caliphate (Seventh-Tenth Centuries)" (PDF). Studia Islamica. 107 (1): 1–37. doi:10.1163/19585705-12341234.
- Davis, Simon J. M. (2008). "Zooarchaeological evidence for Moslem and Christian improvements of sheep and cattle in Portugal". Journal of Archaeological Science. 35 (4): 991–1010. Bibcode:2008JArSc..35..991D. doi:10.1016/j.jas.2007.07.001.
- Decker, Michael (2009). "Plants and Progress: Rethinking the Islamic Agricultural Revolution". Journal of World History. 20 (2): 187–206. doi:10.1353/jwh.0.0058. S2CID 144282174.
- Decter, Jonathan P. (2007). Iberian Jewish Literature: Between al-Andalus and Christian Europe. Indiana University Press. ISBN 978-0-253-11695-6.
- Glick, Thomas F. (October 1977). "Noria Pots in Spain". Technology and Culture. 18 (4): 644–650. doi:10.2307/3103590. JSTOR 3103590.
- Glick, Thomas (1996). Irrigation and Hydraulic Technology: Medieval Spain and its Legacy. Varorium. ISBN 978-0-860-78540-8.
- Idrisi, Zohor (June 2005), The Muslim Agricultural Revolution and its influence on Europe (PDF), Foundation for Science Technology and Civilisation
- Jayyusi, Salma (1994). The legacy of Muslim Spain. Leiden: Brill. ISBN 978-90-04-09954-8.
- Johns, J. (1984). "A Green Revolution?". Journal of African History. 25 (3): 343–368. doi:10.1017/S0021853700028218. S2CID 155524750.
- Lévi-Provençal, E. (2012). "Abū ʿUbayd al-Bakrī". Encyclopaedia of Islam. BrillOnline Reference Works (2nd ed.). Brill. doi:10.1163/1573-3912_islam_SIM_0265.
- Lewicka, Paulina (2011). Food and Foodways of Medieval Cairenes: Aspects of Life in an Islamic Metropolis of the Eastern Mediterranean. Brill. ISBN 978-9004206465.
- Lucas, Adam (2006). Wind, Water, Work: Ancient and Medieval Milling Technology. Brill Publishers. ISBN 90-04-14649-0.
- Mazoyer, Marcel; Roudart, Laurence (2006). A History of World Agriculture: From the Neolithic Age to the Current Crisis. New York University Press. p. 147. ISBN 9781583671214.
- McClellan, James E.; Dorn, Harold (2006). Science and Technology in World History (2nd ed.). Johns Hopkins University Press. p. 102. ISBN 978-0-8018-8360-6.
- Meri, Josef W. (2006). Medieval Islamic Civilization: A-K, index. Taylor & Francis. ISBN 978-0-415-96691-7.
- Oleson, John Peter (2000). "Irrigation". In Wikander, Örjan (ed.). Handbook of Ancient Water Technology. Technology and Change in History. Vol. 2. Leiden: Brill. pp. 183–216. ISBN 90-04-11123-9.
- Rapoport, Yossef; Shahar, Ido (2012). "Irrigation in the Medieval Islamic Fayyum: Local Control in a Large-Scale Hydraulic System". Journal of the Economic and Social History of the Orient. 55 (1): 1–31. doi:10.1163/156852012X628482.
- Ruggles, D. Fairchild (2000). Gardens, Landscape, and Vision in the Palaces of Islamic Spain. Penn State Press. p. 31. ISBN 0-271-04272-9.
- Ruggles, D. Fairchild (2007). "The Great Mosque of Cordoba: Fruited Trees and Ablution Fountains" (Podcast and summary). Islamic Art Doha - Podcasts | Audio/Video Podcasts of the Hamad Bin Khalifa Symposium on Islamic Art. Doha: Hamad Bin Khalifa Symposium on Islamic Art.
- Ruggles, D. Fairchild (2008). Islamic Gardens and Landscapes. University of Pennsylvania Press. ISBN 978-0812240252.
- Scales, Peter C. (1993). The Fall of the Caliphate of Córdoba: Berbers and Andalusis in Conflict. Leiden: Brill. ISBN 90-04-09868-2.
- Schildgen, B. (2016). Heritage or Heresy: Preservation and Destruction of Religious Art and Architecture in Europe. Springer. ISBN 978-0-230-61315-7.
- Squatriti, Paolo (2014). "Of Seeds, Seasons, and Seas: Andrew Watson's Medieval Agrarian Revolution Forty Years Later". The Journal of Economic History. 74 (4): 1205–1220. doi:10.1017/S0022050714000904. S2CID 154969169.
- Turner, Howard R. (1997). Science in Medieval Islam. University of Texas Press. ISBN 0-292-70469-0.
- Watson, Andrew M. (1974). "The Arab Agricultural Revolution and Its Diffusion, 700–1100". The Journal of Economic History. 34 (1): 8–35. doi:10.1017/S0022050700079602. JSTOR 2116954. S2CID 154359726.
- Watson, Andrew M. (1981). "A Medieval Green Revolution: New Crops and Farming Techniques in the Early Islamic World". In Abraham L. Udovitch (ed.). The Islamic Middle East, 700–1900: Studies in Economic and Social History. Darwin Press. ISBN 978-0-87850-030-7.
- Watson, Andrew (2008) [1983]. Agricultural innovation in the early Islamic world : the diffusion of crops and farming techniques 700-1100. Cambridge: Cambridge University Press. ISBN 978-0-521-06883-3.
- Wikander, Örjan (2000). "The Water-Mill". In Wikander, Örjan (ed.). Handbook of Ancient Water Technology. Technology and Change in History. Vol. 2. Leiden: Brill. ISBN 90-04-11123-9.
