= Moncef El Materi =

Tunisian officer and businessman

Moncef El Materi (born 20 November 1934) is a Tunisian businessman and former commanding officer of the artillery of Tunisia. He established Al Adwya, one of Tunisia's biggest private pharmaceutical companies, with his brother Tahar El Materi in the 1970s.

== Biography ==
El Materi was born on 20 November 1934, in Tunis to a wealthy Tunisian bourgeoisie family of Turkish descent; his ancestor, Mohamed Stankouli, was born on the island of Kos, and was a Turkish officer who settled in Tunis at the end of the seventeenth century to defend Turkish interests. In 1930, his mother, Nefissa Ben Cheikh Ahmed (1911-1996), married his father, Hafiz El Materi (1890-1975), who was a young widower with three children (Fatma, Khiareddine, and Slim). Nefissa Hafiz gave four children: Hayet (born 1931), Tahar (born 1932), Moncef (born in 1934) and Sinda (born in 1947). His paternal uncle, Mahmoud El Materi, was a co-founder of Neo-Destour.

El Materi studied at the Sadiki College between 1952 and 1953. However, he was expelled from all schools in Tunisia for demonstrating against the French occupation in 1953. He continued his studies in France to obtain his Bachelor in Nîmes. Between 1956 and 1958, he continued his studies at Ecole Spéciale Militaire de Saint-Cyr and from 1958 to 1959 went to the school of artillery and radar at Chalons-sur-Marne. In December, 1962, following his participation in the coup against President Habib Bourguiba, El Materi was arrested and sentenced to death on 18 January 1963. However, on 24 January, 1963, his sentence was commuted to penal servitude for life by President Bourguiba. In June 1973, after 11 years of imprisonment, he was finally pardoned. From 1973 to 1987, he was a feared opponent by Bourguiba; the regime imposed drastic limitations on his travel outside Tunis and confiscated his passport several times, thus preventing him from traveling abroad. After leaving the Tunisian army in 1973, he devoted himself to the creation of several commercial and industrial enterprises. He is currently a shareholder in equal shares with his brother, Tahar El Materi, the pharmaceutical company Al Adwya, which was founded in 1984.

On May 2, 2011, 37 archaeological pieces were discovered buried in his house in Carthage.

Subject to an international arrest warrant on August 26, 2011, he was sentenced in absentia on February 7, 2012, to eight years in prison and a fine of 31 million dinars for having profited from the sale of declassified land after being ceded by the state.

== Personal life ==
El matri is married to Naima El Ati Boutiba who is also of Turkish descent. He has four children: Beya (born in 1976), Hafiz (born in 1977), Holya (born in 1979) and Mohamed (born in 1981). In 2005, his youngest child, Mohamed El Materi, married the daughter of President Zine El Abidine Ben Ali.
