= Macer Floridus =

Medieval herbal

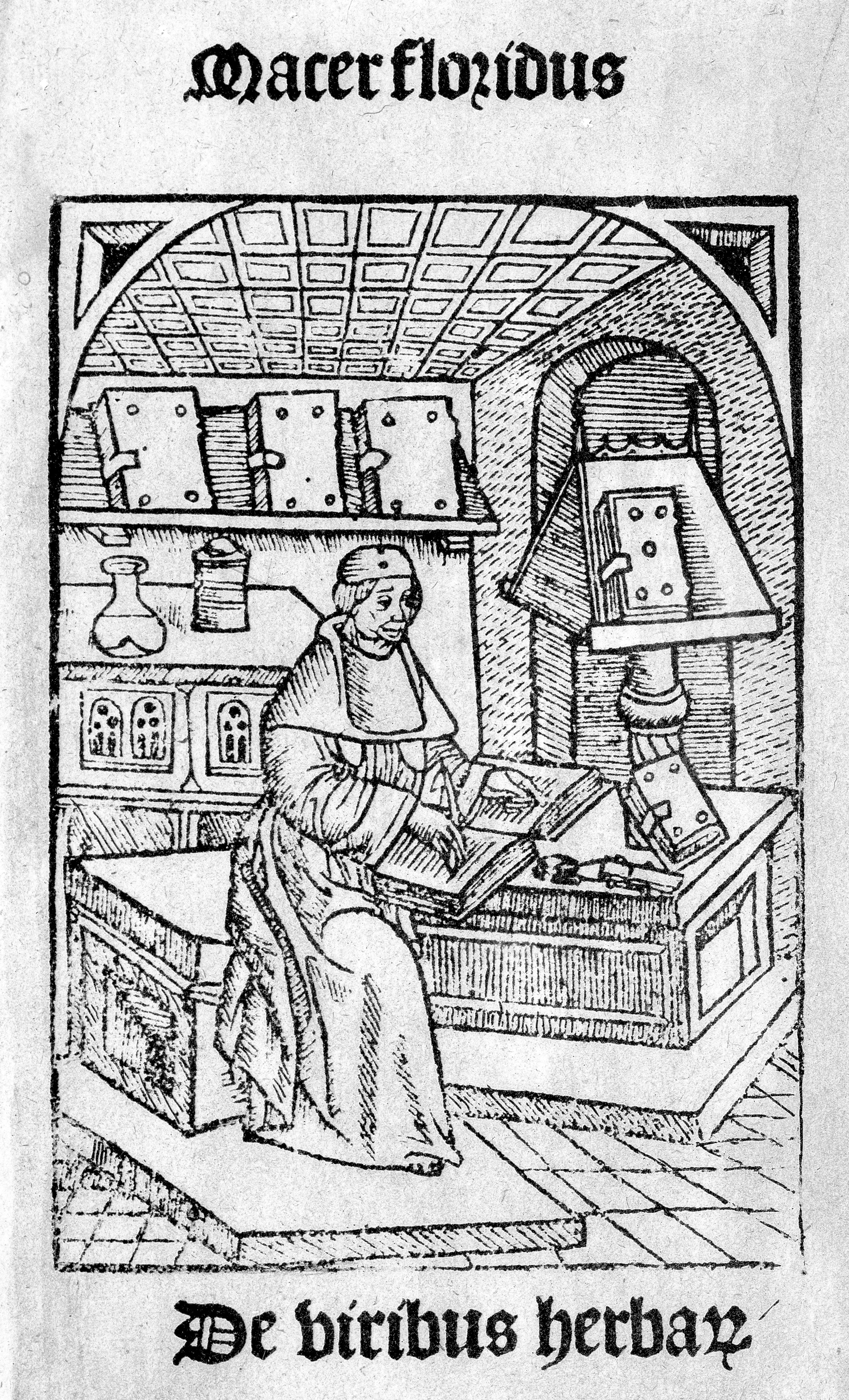
Title page of a 16th century printed edition

De Viribus Herbarum (On the properties of plants), also known by the author's pseudonym, Macer Floridus, is a Latin hexameter poem on the properties of herbs. It was written, probably by Odo of Meung-sur-Loire, in the 11th century. It was still in scholarly use as late as the 16th century, but was superseded by more comprehensive herbals.

== Translations ==
The herbal was translated first into Hebrew, then also German, Catalan, Danish, Dutch, English, French, Italian, and Spanish.

A Middle English version of the poem was translated by John Lelamour, a schoolmaster from Hereford, in the fourteenth century.

== Sources ==
The original poem lists 77 plants and their properties; it is accompanied by 20 additional items known as "Spuria", which were added later. The ultimate source of most of the information is Pliny's Historia naturalis, though Odo may have come to this information second-hand, possibly through the Roman writer Gargilius Martialis.

== See also ==
- Regimen sanitatis Salernitanum
- Treatise on Herbs
