= Sakher El Materi =

Tunisian businessman

Sakher El Materi (Mohamed Sakhr El Materi, Arabic: محمد صخر الماطري, born 2 December 1981) is a Tunisian businessman. He is the son-in-law of Zine El Abidine Ben Ali, who was President of Tunisia until 2011. In 2010 (prior to the Tunisian revolution), Materi's company Princesse El-Materi Holdings was operating in six industry sectors: News and Media, Banking and Financial Services, Automotive, Shipping and Cruises, Real Estate and Agriculture. A member of the ruling Constitutional Democratic Rally, he was elected as a Member of the Chamber of Deputies of Tunisia for the constituency of Tunis on 25 October 2009. He was struck off by the party after the 2011 Tunisian Revolution. After the revolution El Materi fled the country and went to the Seychelles.

== Biography ==
El Materi was born on 2 December 1981 in Tunis into a family of Turkish origin. In 1973, his father, Moncef El Materi, founded El Adwya one of Tunisia's largest private pharmaceutical companies. El Materi's uncle, Mahmoud El Materi, was known for his involvement in the fight for the Tunisian independence and for being one of the co-founders of the Neo Destour political party with the first President of Tunisia, Habib Bourguiba.

After obtaining a Management certificate in Brussels, Sakher El Materi joined his father's company Adwya. Shortly afterwards he married Nesrine, the youngest daughter of President Zine El Abidine Ben Ali. The couple divorced in 2017.

In 2006, El Materi acquired 40% of Nestlé Tunisie through his company, Princesse Holdings, in a transaction that bypassed Nestlé’s preemption rights. The deal, facilitated through the sale of public shares at nominal value, was not coordinated with Nestlé. In 2009, Nestlé repurchased the shares at a higher price. During this period, El Materi’s father, Moncef, served as chairman of the Tunisian subsidiary’s board. He stepped down in 2011, following international sanctions targeting individuals linked to the former regime.

The Tunisian Revolution in early 2011 pushed out the President of Tunisia and all his family members. Interpol issued a global alert to arrest Ben Ali and his relatives, including Sakher.

== Politics ==
In the summer of 2008, he entered the Central Committee of the Democratic Constitutional Rally. On 25 October 2009, he was elected to the Chamber of Deputies.

In a 2009 diplomatic cable from the United States Ambassador Robert Godec that was leaked during the United States diplomatic cables leak, the diplomat opined that El Materi and Nesrine and other members of Ben Ali's family were disliked and even hated by some Tunisians for their perceived lavish lifestyle.

The Canadian Press described him as "one of the most powerful members of Tunisia's ruling class", and before Zine El Abidine Ben Ali, the President of Tunisia and Materi's father-in-law, fled Tunisia amidst the 2010–2011 protests, Materi was considered by some to be a possible successor to Ben Ali as President.

In January 2011, after the collapse of the Ben Ali regime, it was mistakenly reported that Sakher was going to a house he owns in Montreal, Quebec, Canada; a group of people critical of his father-in-law's regime then gathered outside the property. Sakher is still on the title deed of the house and the address listed, and although there are reports saying it was sold, no record of any sale has been found according to the official home listings.

In July 2011, a Tunisian court convicted him of corruption in absentia, sentencing him to 16 years in prison. In December 2012, with an international arrest warrant outstanding, local authorities in Seychelles arrested Materi. However he was not extradited and as of 2016 remains in the Seychelles.

In 2017, Sakher offered the Tunisian government over $200 million in exchange for a right to return to Tunisia. The government did not respond. His house in the Seychelles was reportedly put up for sale in 2019 amidst rumours that Sakher and his family could move to Qatar.

== Personal life ==
His father, Moncef El Materi, and mother, Naima El Ati Boutiba, are both of Turkish descent. El Materi has three siblings: Beya (born in 1976), Hafiz (born in 1977), and Holya (born in 1979). In 2005, El Materi married the daughter of President Zine El Abidine Ben Ali.
