= Officinal =

Drugs and plants sold in a pharmacy

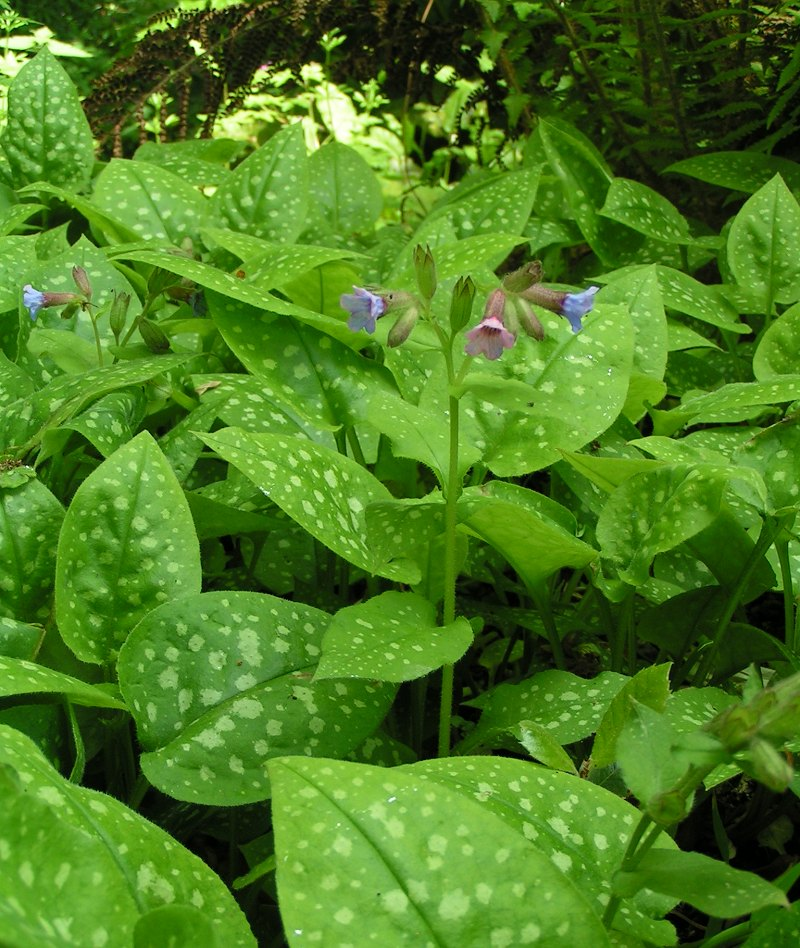
Lungwort (Pulmonaria officinalis) - the plant's botanical name suggests its pharmaceutical use

Officinal drugs, plants and herbs are those which are sold in a chemist or druggist shop. Officinal medical preparations of such drugs are made in accordance with the prescriptions authorized by a pharmacopoeia. Officinal is not to be mixed with the word official. The classical Latin officina meant a workshop, manufactory, laboratory, and in medieval Latin was applied to a general storeroom. It thus became applied to a shop where goods were sold rather than a place where things were made. Whereas official descends from officium, meaning office, as in duty or position.

In botanical nomenclature, the specific epithet officinalis derives from a plant's historical use in pharmacology.

== See also ==
- Herbalism
- Officinalis
