= Geoponici =

Greek and Latin agricultural writers

Geoponici (the Latinized form of a nonexistent Γεωπονικοί, used for convenience), or Scriptores rei rusticae, is a collective term for the Greek and Latin writers on husbandry and agriculture. In classical times this topic was regarded as a branch of economics.

== Greek writers ==
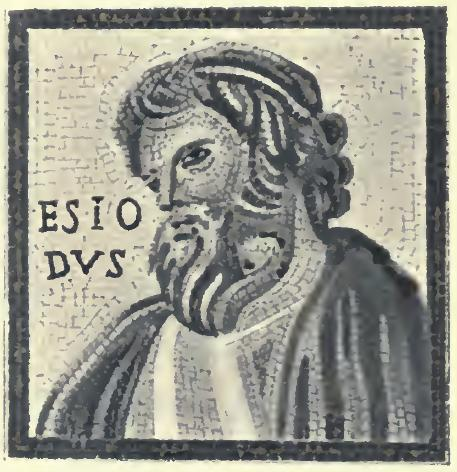
Hesiod, 3-4 c. AD.

From the writing of the Roman Varro, it is known that there were more than fifty ancient Greek authors on the subject of agriculture. Among them were Hesiod, Xenophon, Democritus, Aristotle and his pupil Theophrastus. Most of the works Varro enumerated have been lost.

What we know of the agriculture of Greece is chiefly derived from the poem of Hesiod, entitled Works and Days. All that remain of Democritus are only a few extracts preserved in the Geoponica, an agricultural treatise published at Constantinople by the Greeks of the 10th century. The Oeconomicus by Xenophon is a Socratic dialogue principally about household management and agriculture, which contains a eulogy of agriculture and its beneficial ethical effects.

About the same time as Xenophon, the philosopher Democritus of Abdera wrote a treatise Περὶ Γεωργίας ("On Agriculture"), frequently quoted and much used by the later compilers of the Geoponica. Some incidental remarks on the subject may be found in the writings of Herodotus, Theophrastus, and others. Aristotle, Homer, and others touch on the subject but very slightly.

Greater attention was given to the subject in the Alexandrian period; a long list of names is given by Varro and Columella, amongst them Hiero II and Attalus III Philometor. Later, Cassius Dionysius of Utica translated and abridged the great work of the Carthaginian Mago, which was still further condensed by Diophanes of Nicaea in Bithynia for the use of King Deiotarus. From these and similar works, Cassianus Bassus compiled his Geoponica, a source of the later Byzantine Geoponica. Mention may also be made of a little work Περι Γεωργικων by Michael Psellus.

== Latin writers ==
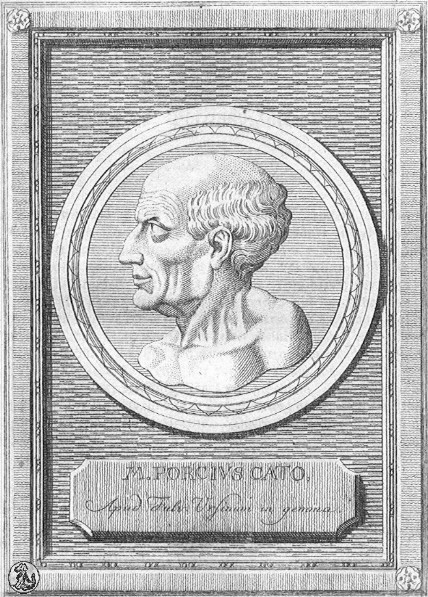
Marcus Porcius Cato.

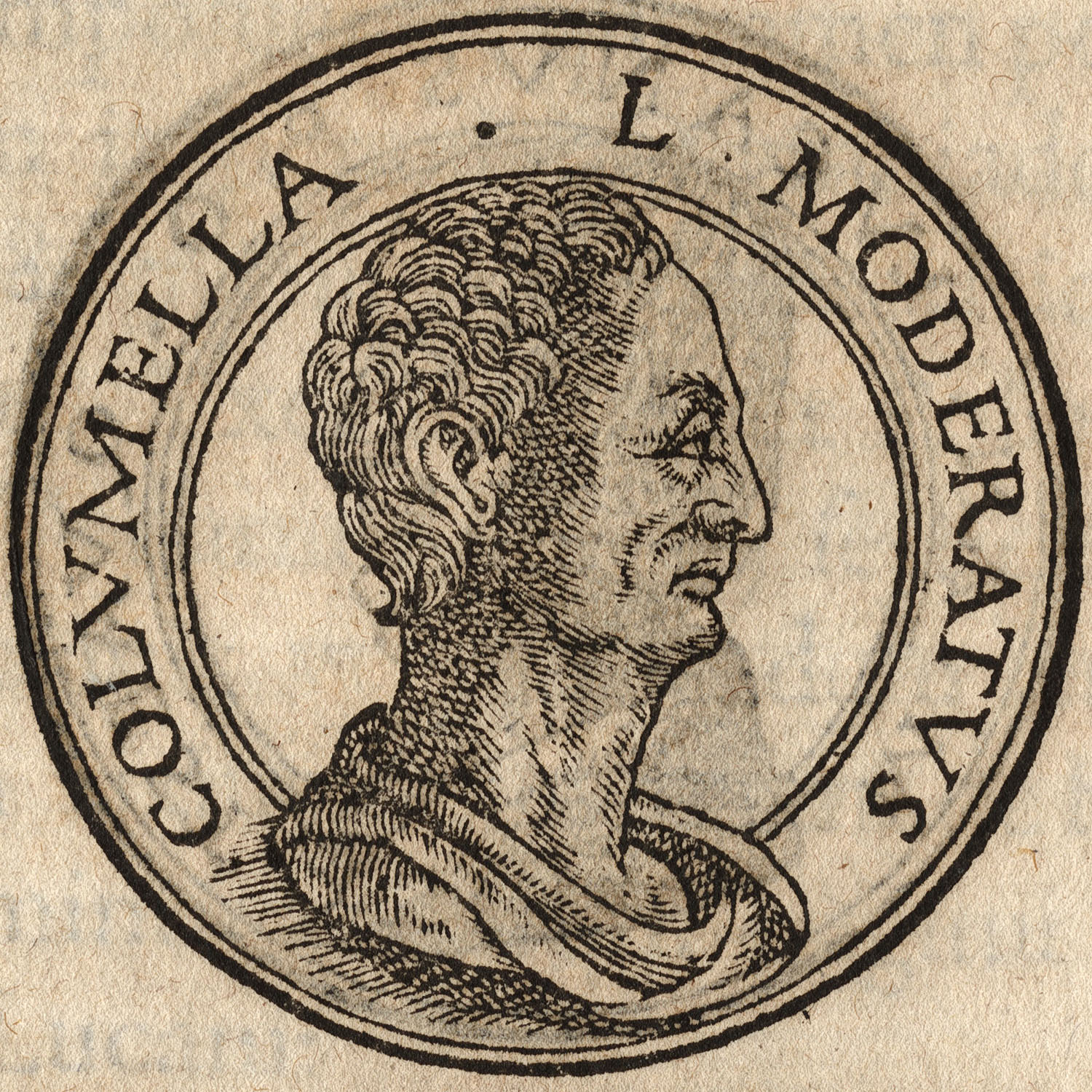
Columella.

The Latin authors on agriculture, whose works have reached the present age, are Cato, Varro, Virgil, Columella, Pliny, and Palladius; there were many more, whose writings are lost. The Romans, aware of the necessity of maintaining a numerous and thriving order of agriculturists, from very early times endeavoured to instill into their countrymen both a theoretical and a practical knowledge of the subject. The occupation of the farmer was considered next in importance to that of the soldier, and distinguished Romans did not disdain to practice it.

In furtherance of this object:

- The great work of Mago was translated into Latin by Decimus Junius Silanus at the order of the Roman Senate;
- The elder Cato had meanwhile written his De agri cultura, a simple record in homely language of the rules observed by the old Roman landed proprietors rather than a theoretical treatise.
- Cato was followed by the two Saserna (father and son), and Gnaeus Tremellius Scrofa, whose works are lost.
- The learned Marcus Terentius Varro of Reate, when eighty years of age, composed his Rerum rusticarum libri tres, dealing with agriculture, the rearing of cattle, and the breeding of fishes. He was the first to systematize what had been written on the subject, and supplemented the labours of others by practical experience gained during his travels.

In the Augustan age:

- Julius Hyginus wrote on farming and beekeeping,
- Sabinus Tiro on horticulture, and during the early Empire,
- Julius Graecinus and Julius Atticus on the culture of vines, and
- Cornelius Celsus (best known for his De Medicina) on farming.

The chief work of the kind, however, is that of Lucius Junius Moderatus Columella, De Arboribus and De Agricultura.

About the middle of the 2nd century, the two Quinctilii, natives of Troja, wrote on the subject in Greek. It is remarkable that Columella's work exercised less influence in Rome and Italy than in southern Gaul and Spain, where agriculture became one of the principal subjects of instruction in the superior educational establishments that were springing up in those countries. One result of this was the preparation of manuals of a popular kind for use in the schools. In the 3rd century, Gargilius Martialis of Mauretania compiled a Geoponica in which medical botany and the veterinary art were included.

The Opus Agriculturae of Palladius (4th century), in fourteen books, which is largely derived from Columella, is rearranged into a farmer's calendar, in which the different rural occupations are arranged in order of months. The fourteenth book (on forestry) is written in elegiacs (eighty-five couplets). The whole of Palladius and considerable fragments of Gargilius Martialis are extant.

== Appreciation ==
The Romans knew of many advanced techniques such as green manuring with legumes, soiling, seed selection, the testing of soil for sourness, intensive cultivation of a fallow as well as of a crop, conservative rotation, the importance of livestock in a system of general farming, and the preservation of the chemical content of manure and the composting of the rubbish of a farm. The foundation of their agriculture was the fallow and one finds them constantly using it as a simile — in the advice not to breed a mare every year, as in that not to exact too much tribute from a bee hive. Ovid even warns a lover to allow fallow seasons to intervene in his courtship.

== See also ==
- Agriculture in ancient Greece
- Roman agriculture
- History of agriculture
- History of agricultural science
