= Cancer (mythology) =

Giant crab in Greek mythology

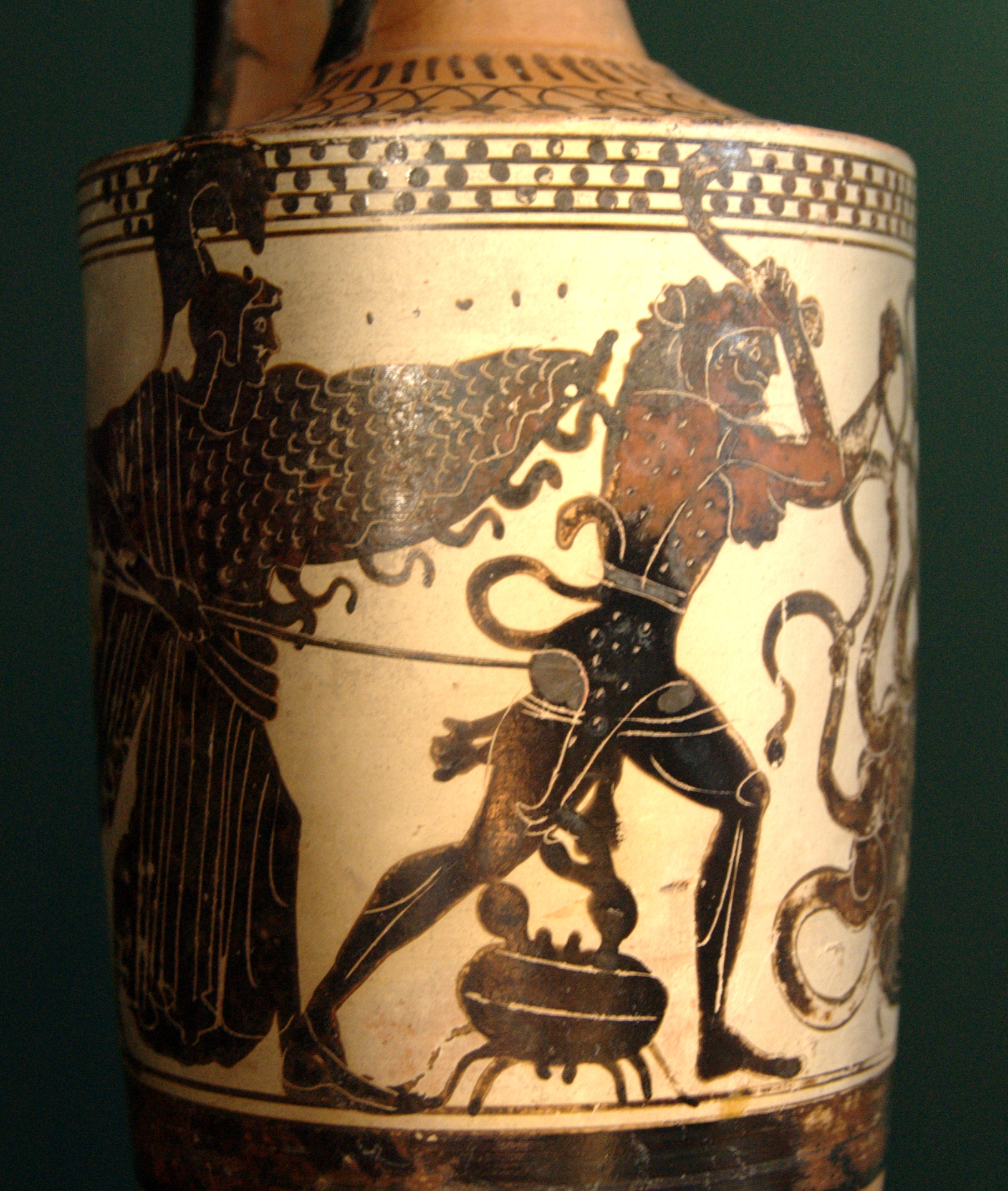
Heracles attacked by land monster the Lernaean Hydra. White-ground Attic lekythos, c. 500–475 BC.

Cancer also known as Carcinus (Ancient Greek: Καρκίνος, romanized: Karkínos, lit. 'crab') or, simply the Crab, is a giant crab in Greek mythology that inhabited the lagoon of Lerna. He is a secondary character in the myth of the twelve labors of Heracles, who attacks Heracles on Hera's orders, while Heracles is in the midst of fighting the Hydra of Lerna. Heracles kills the Crab, who is rewarded for his efforts by Hera turning him into the constellation of Cancer.

Since it is not a main element of the myth, it does not always appear in the versions that have reached the present day; nevertheless, classic mythographers, astronomers, historians or philosophers such as Plato, the Pseudo-Eratosthenes, Apollodorus and Hyginus mention the character in their texts.

One of the most common interpretations of the myth associates it with a 22nd-century BC battle in the Peloponnese, which resulted in the destruction of Lerna (Minoan-influenced) by pre-Mycenaean peoples

In art, Carcinus is often depicted as a detail of the myth of the Hydra or as an image of the Zodiac sign and the constellation to which it gives its name.

== Etymology ==
The name "Carcinus" is a latinisation of the Ancient Greek word Καρκίνος, which literally means "crab". This is why, according to the version and translation of the myth, the character is not referred to by his original name but only as a giant crab, the Crab or Cancer.

"Cancer" is the translation of the word karkinos into Latin, made by Aulus Cornelius Celsus and collected in his work De Medicina. The Greek term had been used since Hippocrates (460–370 BC) to denote certain types of tumors, because of the resemblance that the Greek physician observed between the lesions and the shape of a crab. Celsus continued to use the analogy and introduced the term that has endured to the present day to denote that group of diseases.

The word Καρκίνος is still used in the Greek language today for several of the meanings of the word cancer. Other words such as "carcinoma" (also used by Hippocrates), "carcinogen" or "carcinology" share the original Greek root, in reference to both the crustaceans and the disease.

== Role in mythology ==
Note: the following is a summarized version of the mythological context; in addition, please note that there are several variants for many of the myths, depending on the work consulted.

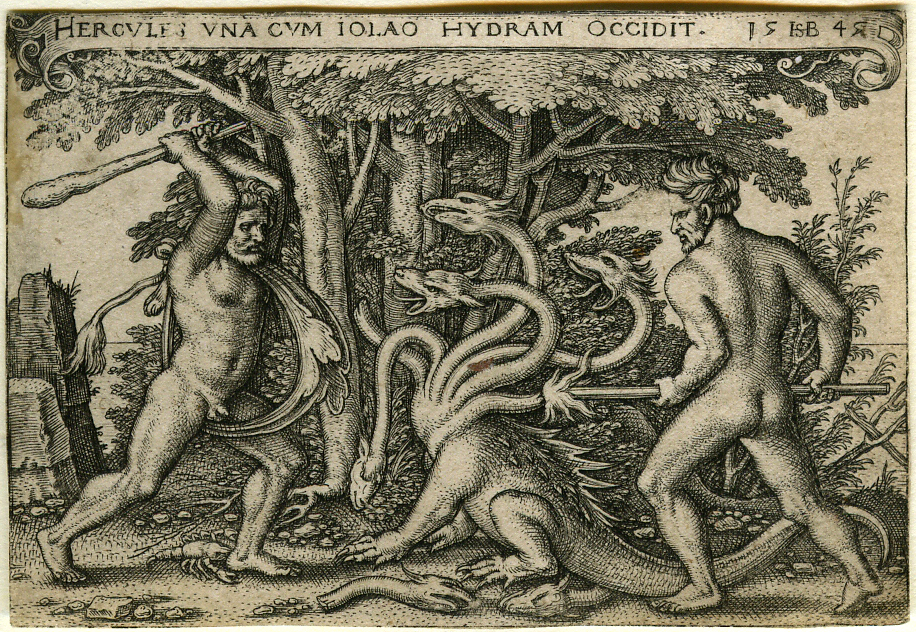
Hercules slaying the Hydra, 1545. Engraving by Hans Sebalm Beham.

Zeus, king of the Olympian Gods, lay with the mortal Alcmene and gave birth to Heracles. Zeus' wife, the goddess Hera, jealous of her consort's infidelity, turned her spite on the child and attempted to cause him death or suffering on several occasions throughout his life.

Heracles reached adulthood and married the princess Megara, with whom he had several children. Hera provoked a fit of madness in Heracles, during which the young greek murdered his wife and children. The sibyl of the Delphi Oracle ordered as penance the performance of ten labors ordered by his cousin Eurystheus, king of Argolid.

These ten labors plus two additional ones, as Eurystheus considered two of the initial ones invalid because they could not be completed without help, formed the so-called twelve labors of Heracles. The second of these consisted of killing the Hydra of Lerna, a monster in the form of a multi-headed serpent, which inhabited the lagoon near the city.

Once he reached the swamp, Heracles confronted the Hydra. He tried to cut off the heads of the beast but for every one he cut off, two more grew. While the two were fighting, Hera sent Carcinus, a giant crab that also lived in the area, to help the beast. The crab attacked Heracles' feet with its claws to throw him off so that the Hydra could kill him; however, the enraged Greek hero crushed it with his heel in response and continued the battle.

With the help of Iolaos, his nephew, he found a way to defeat the monster by applying fire to the severed necks before new heads could grow; thus, Heracles was able to finish off the Hydra. He buried the main head, still hissing as it was immortal, under a large rock near the road from Lerna to Elaeus. In addition, he cut the beast open so that the tips of his arrows could be soaked in its internal fluids, and from then on any wound caused by them would be fatal.

This work was one of those considered invalid by Eurystheus, since Heracles received the help of his nephew to carry it to completion.

=== Catasterism ===
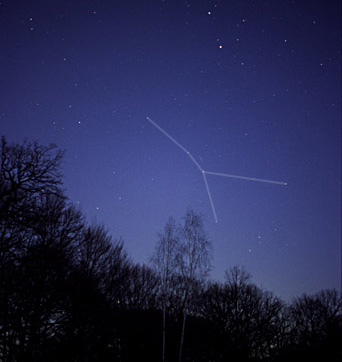
Constellation of Cancer

A catasterism is the account of the transformation of a character in Greek mythology into a star or constellation. According to the myth, Hera, grateful for Carcinus' valiant but unsuccessful effort, placed him in the sky creating the constellation of Cancer in the Zodiac. He was placed next to the Lion, the figure placed by Zeus in commemoration of the death of the Lion of Nemea at the hands of his son Heracles in the first of his labors.

=== Variants of the myth ===
Like the figure of the Hydra, Carcinus has several variants depending on what the author of the version includes in his text:

- Regarding its very existence, then, as a secondary element in the myth of the Hydra, several versions do not mention the character of Carcinus in the second labor of Heracles. This fact is usually explained by the hypothesis that it was introduced in the main story by Mesopotamian influence, in the attempt of the astrologers to associate the labors of Heracles with the twelve signs of the Zodiac.
- As for the name by which he is designated, as has already been indicated, the name of the character is frequently omitted or changed, replacing it simply by crab or by his Roman name, Cancer. He occasionally receives epithets such as "Lernaeus", for his origin, in Columella's De re rustica or "Littoreus", presumably for his habits, in Ovid's Metamorphoses and Manilius' Astronomica, as William Smith indicates in his work, A Dictionary of Greek and Roman Antiquities.
- Depending on the way in which Carcinus attacks Heracles, depending on the version or translation of the text, the most frequent ones being to restrain, sting or bite. Nevertheless, the different versions agree that his attack was an element of distraction for Heracles, with the intention of unbalancing the combat in favor of the Hydra, without constituting an opponent that could by itself finish off the Greek hero.

== The myth according to the classics ==
The crab Carcinus does not appear in all versions of the myth of the second labor of Heracles and, therefore, in those related texts, mainly about mythology or astronomy, that have come down to us; for example, in the famous poem around 275 BC by Aratus, Phenomena, (which describes the constellations and other celestial bodies, commenting for some of them on the associated myth) only the constellation of Cancer is mentioned to locate the Asses and the Manger:

Observe also the Manger. Resembling a small nebula, it marches encompassed in the Crab in a northerly direction; around it revolve two stars that shine little, neither too far away nor too close to it, but which, to the naked eye, would appear to be about a cubit apart; one is to the North, the other faces South. They are called the Asses and in the middle is the Manger.

— Aratus, Phenomena, 892–896

As noted above, this fact is often attributed to the theory that these bodies had a history of Greek origin prior to the association of the constellation with a crab, probably due to Mesopotamian influence, where the constellation appears with the name Al-lul, "crab" in Sumerian.

The oldest reference to the myth is found in the Catasterismi (a work compiled around the first century BC in which the transformations of mythological characters into stars or constellations are narrated), erroneously attributed to Eratosthenes (third century BC):

Crab: It is believed that he was placed among the constellations by Hera, since he was the only one who, while the others were fighting on the side of Heracles when he killed the Hydra, coming out of the lagoon stung him on the foot, as Paniasis says in his Heraclea. And it is known that Heracles, enraged, crushed him with his foot, hence he obtained the great honor of being counted among the twelve signs of the Zodiac.

— Pseudo-Eratosthenes, Catasterismi

Apart from the version of the text itself, the mention of the Heraclea of the 5th century BC poet Panyassis of Halicarnassus, of whom only a few fragments are preserved, stands out as a reference (the first of which there is evidence at present) to the version of the myth presented.

In the dialogue Euthydemus, Plato refers in the 4th century BC to the myth in a dialogue between Socrates, Crito, Euthydemus and his brother Dionysodorus, Cleinias and Ctesippus; the text is a criticism of the sophists, who use fallacies (sophisms) for their reasoning:

[...] Indeed, I am much weaker than Heracles, who could not fight against the Hydra, this sophist, who by her wisdom-every time he cut off a head of reasoning-she brought out many instead of one, and also against another sophist of the sea, a crab, who recently, it seems to me, landed. When this one thus annoyed him and spoke to him from the left and bit him, [Heracles] called to his aid his nephew Yolaos, who helped him sufficiently. [...]

— Plato, Euthydemus, 278c

By using the myth, the character of Socrates mocks the sophist brothers and their reasoning by comparing them to the monsters Hydra and Carcinus.

In De astronomia, a work on catasterisms traditionally attributed to Hyginus (1st century BC), the myth is also mentioned in its most widespread version:

It is said that the Crab was placed among the stars by Juno, because, when Hercules was confronting the Hydra of Lerna, it came out of the swamp and bit him on the foot. Hercules, enraged, killed him, and Juno placed him among the constellations to be one of the twelve signs united by the circuit of the sun.

— Hyginus, De astronomia, 13: Crab

Given the assimilation of Greek mythology that took place in Ancient Rome and the fact that Hyginus was Latin, the characters in the text appear with their Roman names, Juno corresponding to Hera and Hercules to Heracles.

In Bibliotheca, an exhaustive compilation of Greek mythology written around the 1st–2nd centuries AD, erroneously attributed to Apollodorus of Athens, the creature is also mentioned:

As his second labor [Eurystheus] ordered him [Heracles] to kill the Hydra of Lerna. [...] A giant crab came to the Hydra's aid by biting him on the foot. So he killed it and asked Yolaos for help [...].

— Pseudo-Apollodorus, Bibliotheca, 2.5.2

On the other hand, many other classical authors do not mention Carcinus in their texts in the myth of the Hydra, such as Hesiod in his Theogony, Pausanias in his Description of Greece, Diodorus Siculus in his Bibliotheca historica, or Euripides in his Herakles, which emphasizes the secondary character of the Crab with respect to the second labor of Heracles.

== Interpretations of the myth ==
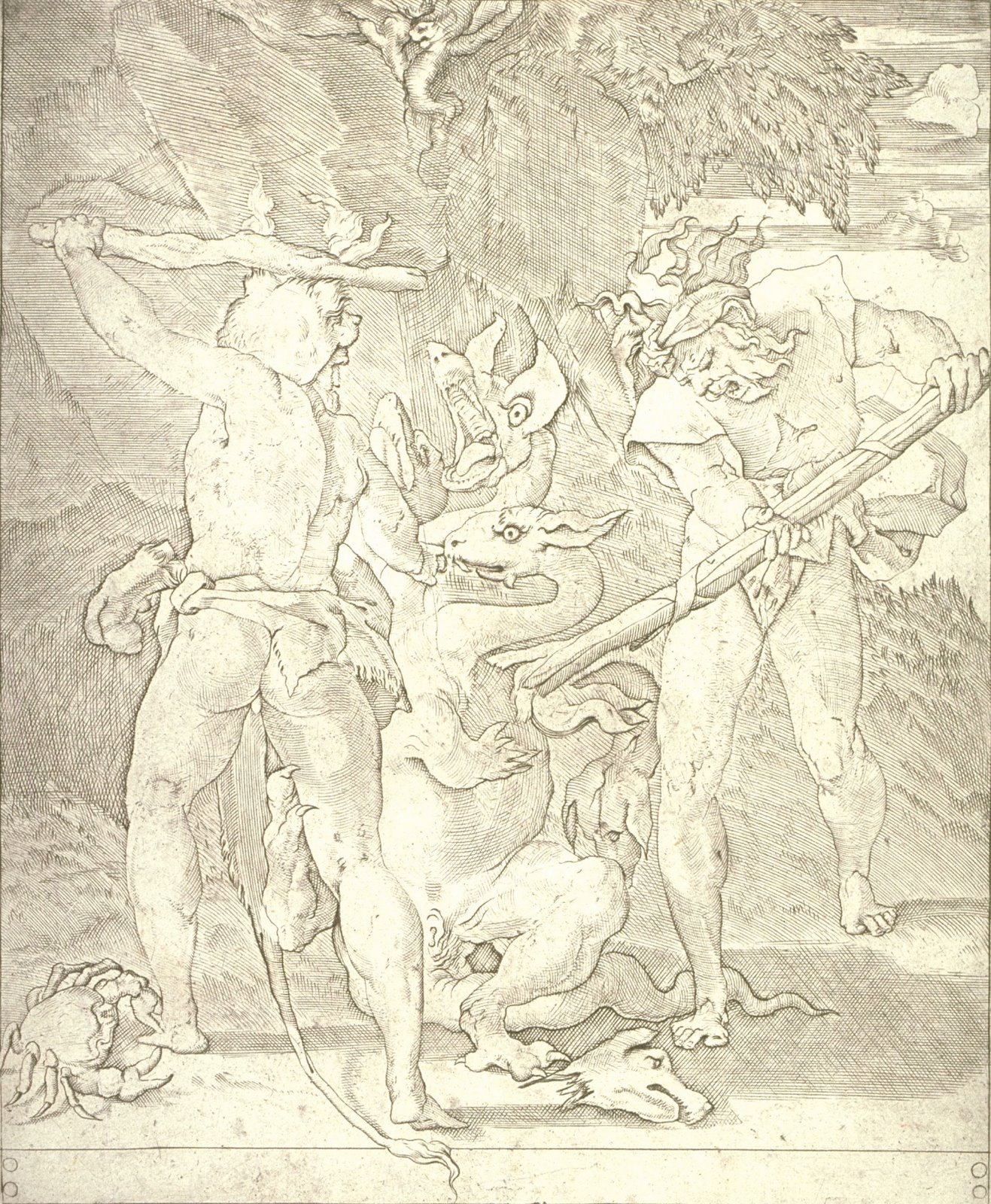
Engraving by Giovanni Jacopo Caraglio, 16th century

Myths have, as a rule, non-literal readings by which fantastic stories reflect in an allegorical or symbolic way facts, situations or behaviors in reality. Various interpretations of the second labor of Heracles have been attributed to him throughout history:

- A warlike interpretation, whereby, according to the peripatetic Palaephatus, the myth is associated with the destruction of Lerna, under Minoan influence, by the pre-Mycenaean peoples around the 22nd century B.C. The Hydra would correspond to the Palace of Lerna, the multiple heads to the archers and hoplites of the city, and Carcinus to a mercenary who would lead supporting forces for the defense. The defeated armies, the burned city and the palace buried under a mound would generate the analogies used later in the myth.
- A geological interpretation, in which, according to the euhemerist Servius, the Hydra is identified with the swamp of Lerna itself and its heads with the subway springs or rivers that fed it, frustrating the attempts to drain the area to clean it up.
- A religious interpretation, whereby the death of the Hydra at the hands of Heracles corresponds to the suppression by the invading Achaean or Dorian peoples of the native fertility rites of Lerna, performed by priestesses who spread the Minoan influence from Crete.
- An astronomical interpretation, in which the characters represent celestial bodies in a certain situation; Heracles destroys the Hydra and the Crab just as the light of the Sun fades the constellations during the dawn, when the star rises over the horizon.
- An esoteric interpretation, whereby the multiple heads of the Hydra are related to the evil thoughts and desires to be overcome by the individual in his personal growth.

== Morphology ==
The classical authors who mention Carcinus in the myth of the Hydra do not offer in their texts descriptions of the shape or type of crab beyond the occasional allusion to the remarkable size of the specimen. This gap in the description has led to the diversity in the type of crustacean that appears in the representations of the character, showing both crayfish (similar in appearance to small lobsters, with a well differentiated cephalothorax and abdomen) and sea crabs (with an abdomen reduced to little more than an appendage under the cephalothorax) at the discretion of the artist.

The writings of classical naturalists or geoponists, such as Aristotle, Pliny the Elder or Cassianus Bassus, and modern studies in carcinology give an idea of the known species of crabs that would influence the mental image that people would obtain upon hearing the myth, as well as the artistic representations that have been made of it:

- Regarding crayfish, the most widespread species in Europe and around the Mediterranean are Austropotamobius pallipes, Austropotamobius torrentium and Astacus astacus, from the family Astacidae. Other species common today, such as Pacifastacus leniusculus or Procambarus clarkii, were introduced during the 20th century, seriously affecting native crab populations due to aphanomycosis, a disease caused by the fungus Aphanomyces astaci, which they carry.
- Among the numerous species that inhabit the Mediterranean Sea, some of the most common are Carcinus aestuarii and Cancer pagurus.

Of the crabs cited, Cancer pagurus specimens are the most voluminous, with a carapace width of about 24 cm, the maximum recorded being 30 cm.

== Influence on art ==
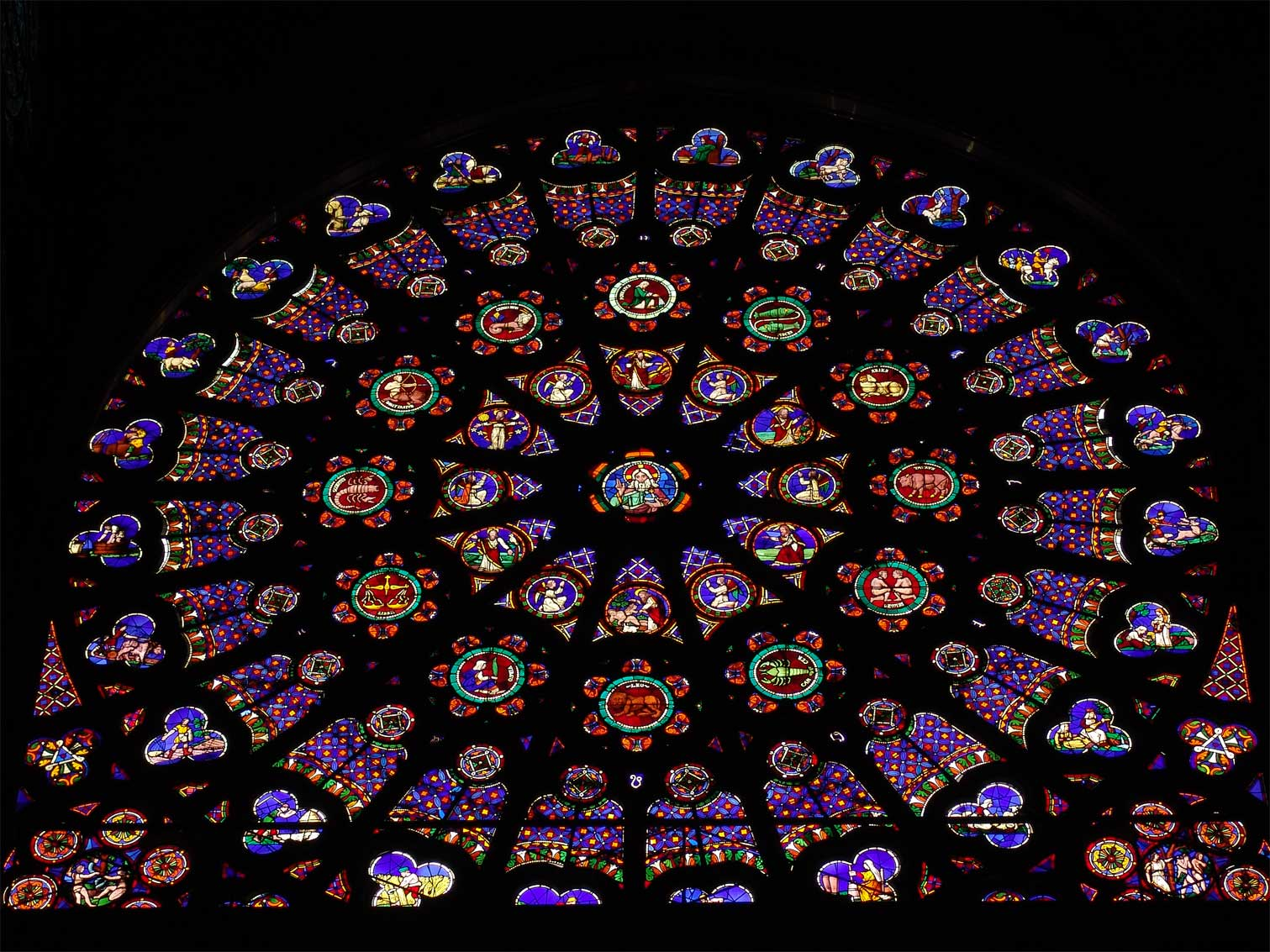
Rose window on St. Denis Cathedral

The character of Carcinus is represented in art mainly as part of the myth of the Hydra, as a zodiac sign or as a constellation on celestial charts.

The artistic techniques used in their representations are diverse, highlighting Ancient pottery, the reliefs and stained glass of the Middle Ages, the Renaissance engravings or the drawings in the atlases of astronomy of the last centuries of the second millennium.

On the other hand, as has been indicated, there is no unanimity in the typology of crab that would correspond to the character, showing both crayfish and sea crabs.

=== About the myth ===
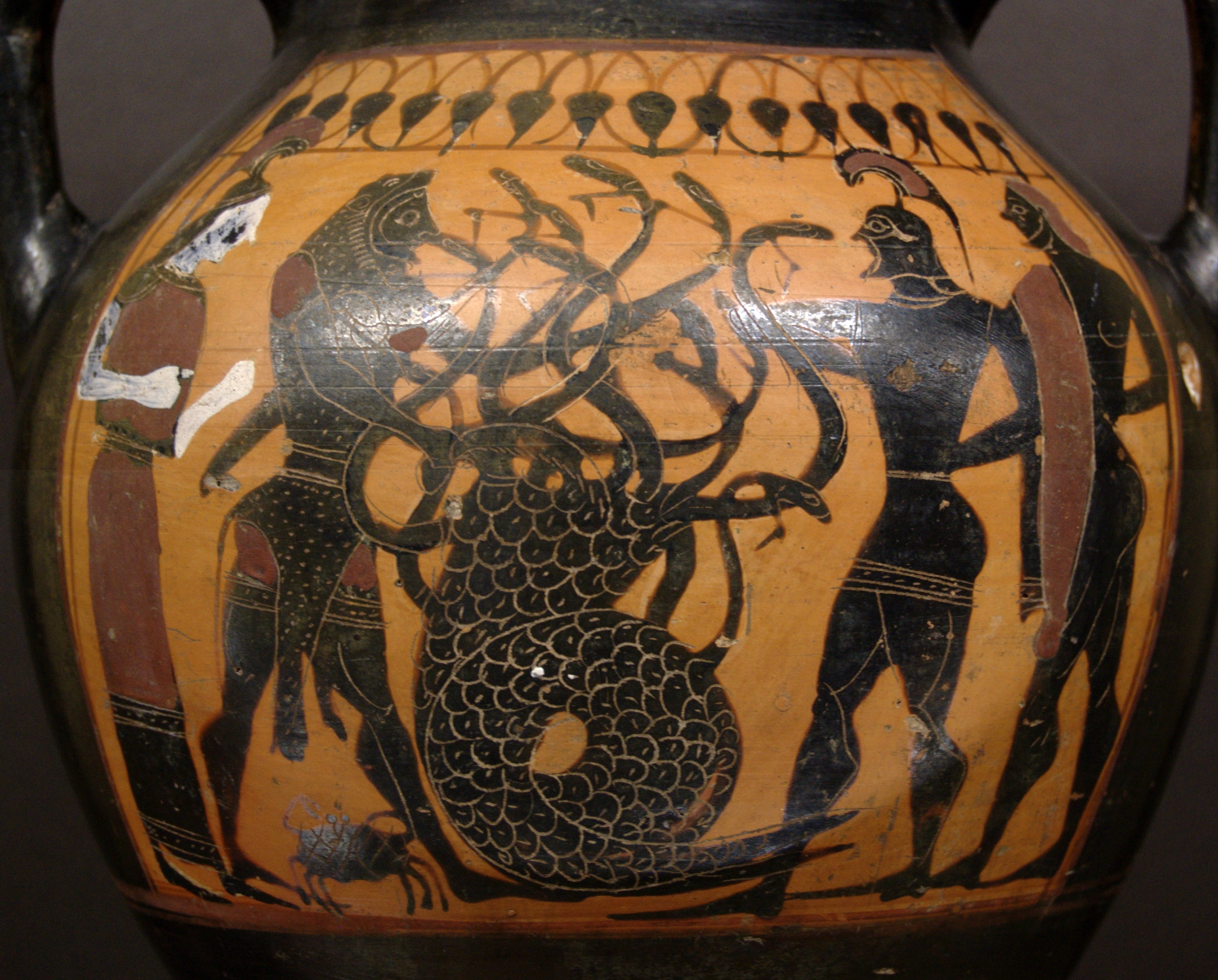
Detail on Attic amphora (540–530 BC). Louvre Museum.

Among the twelve labors of Heracles, the second is one of the most frequently depicted in art, especially by post-classical artists, both in painting and sculpture; however, as in writings, not all artistic representations of the myth include the figure of Carcinus.

During Classical antiquity, examples of ceramic decoration found on Greek lekythoi, hydriai, aryballoi and other types of vessels, usually from the 6th and 5th centuries BC and belonging to the predominant black and red-figure styles of the time, stand out. In these depictions, Carcinus is generally shown as a sea crab.

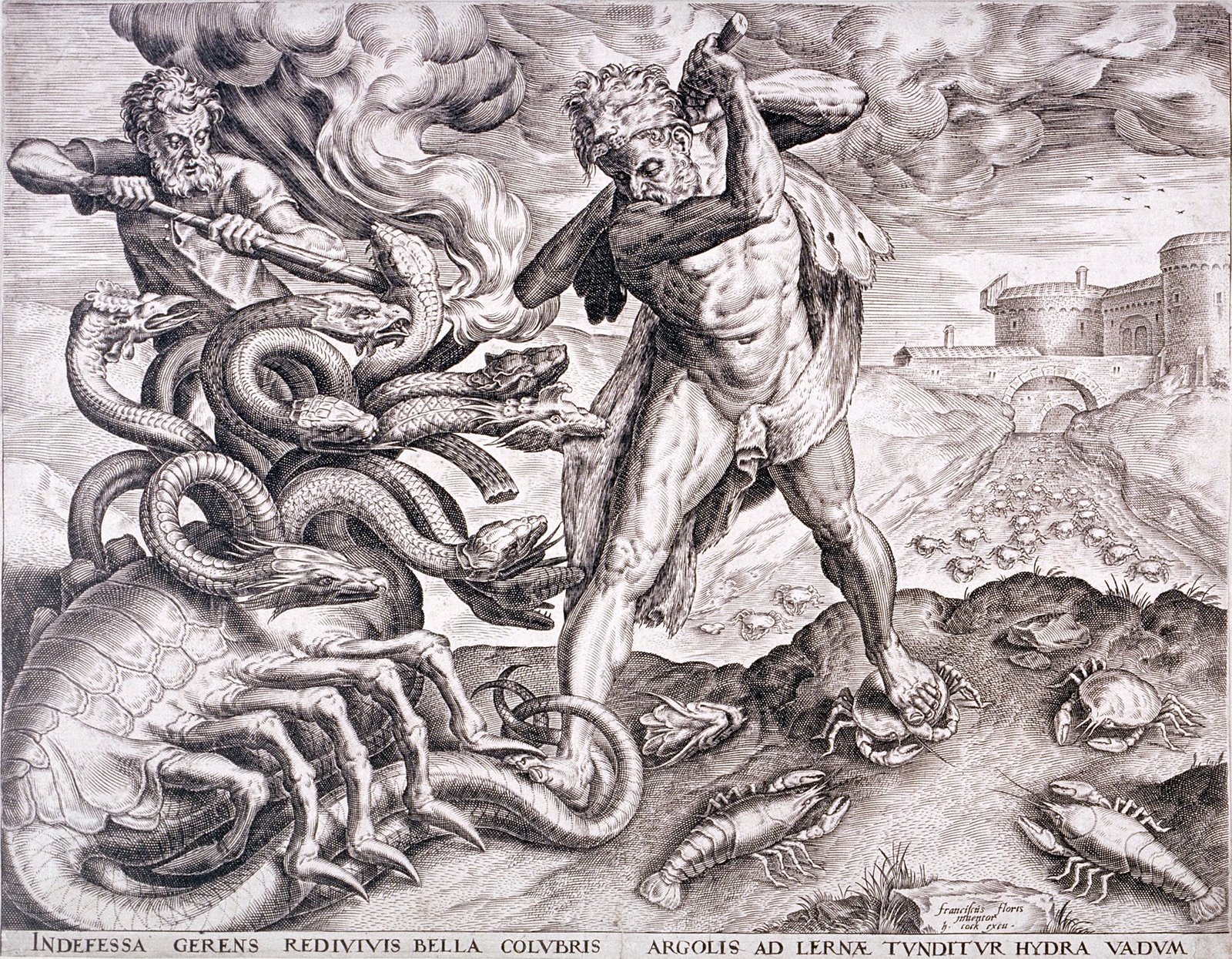
Engraving by Cornelis Cort (c. 1565)

During the 16th century, at the height of the Renaissance, several engravings depicting the labors of Heracles were produced. In part of those showing the fight against the Hydra of Lerna, Carcinus also appears; of these, some of the most relevant are the works of the following artists:

- Hans Sebald Beham, German printer considered one of the most important of the Little Masters, the group of German artists who specialized in engravings after the influence of Dürer. In his work, Carcinus' appears in the form of a crayfish.
- Giovanni Jacopo Caraglio, Italian engraver, pupil of Marcantonio Raimondi; they specialized in making reproductions of Renaissance paintings, especially those of Raphael. Carcinus appears in the form of a sea crab.
- Cornelis Cort, Dutch engraver who collaborated regularly with Titian. In his work, Carcinus appears in the form of a sea crab, although many other crabs appear, both crayfish and sea crabs, surrounding or heading towards Heracles.

In 1634, the Spanish Golden Age painter Francisco de Zurbarán painted the oil painting Hercules and the Hydra, inspired by the aforementioned engraving by Cornelis Cort. It is currently on display in the Prado Museum, Madrid.

=== Zodiac ===
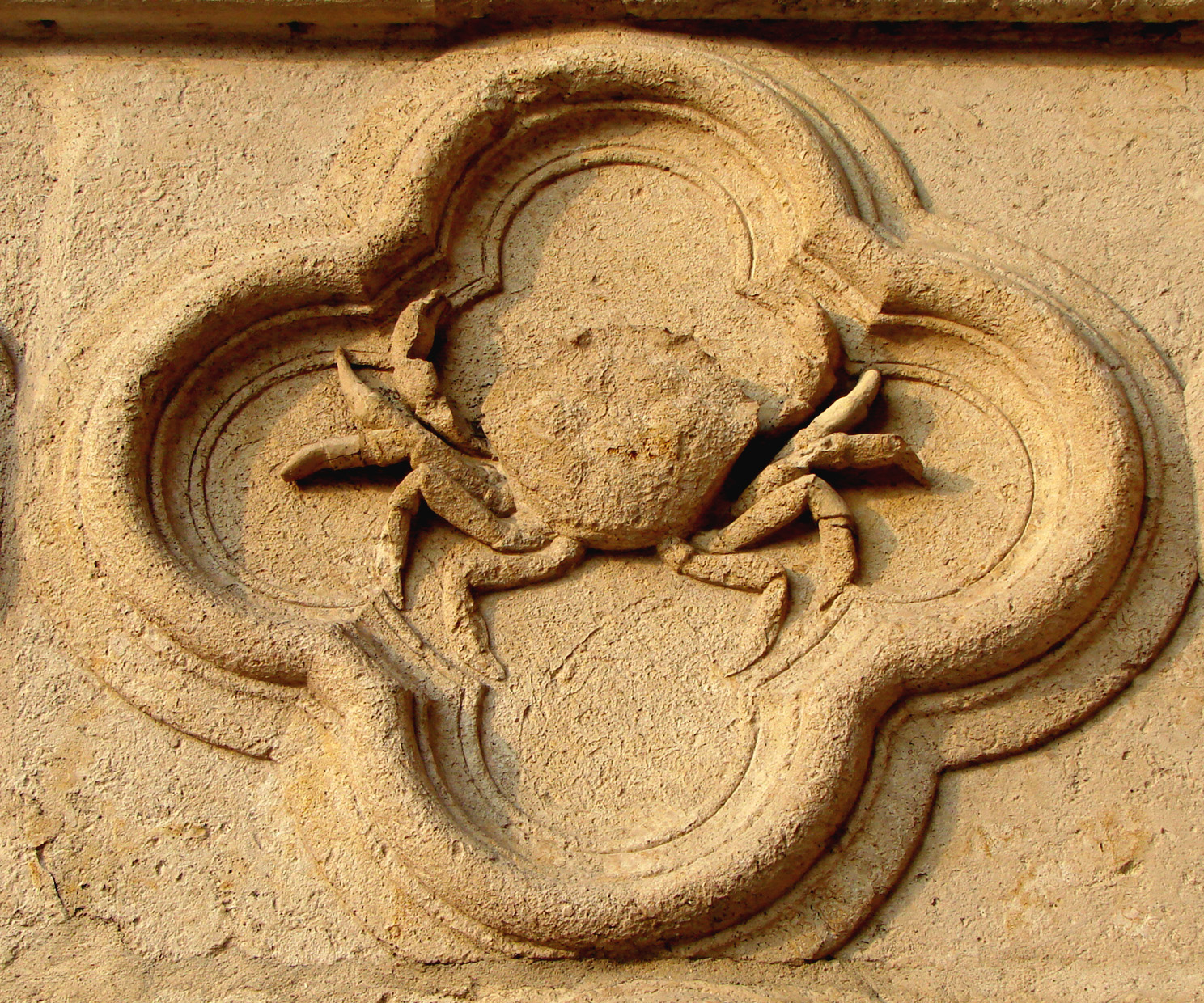
Relief in the Cathedral of Amiens

Despite their pagan origin and general rejection by the Christian Churches, the signs of the Zodiac have been frequently represented in medieval art, specifically in reliefs, paintings and stained glass windows in the churches themselves. Some of the temples where these representations can be found are:

- The 12th century Romanesque basilica of San Isidoro in Leon, Spain, where the zodiac signs appear in the main access to the temple. Cancer appears in the form of a sea crab.
- The 12th century Gothic basilica of Saint-Denis, France, in which there is a rose window in which the signs of the Zodiac surround Christ. Cancer appears in the form of a crayfish.
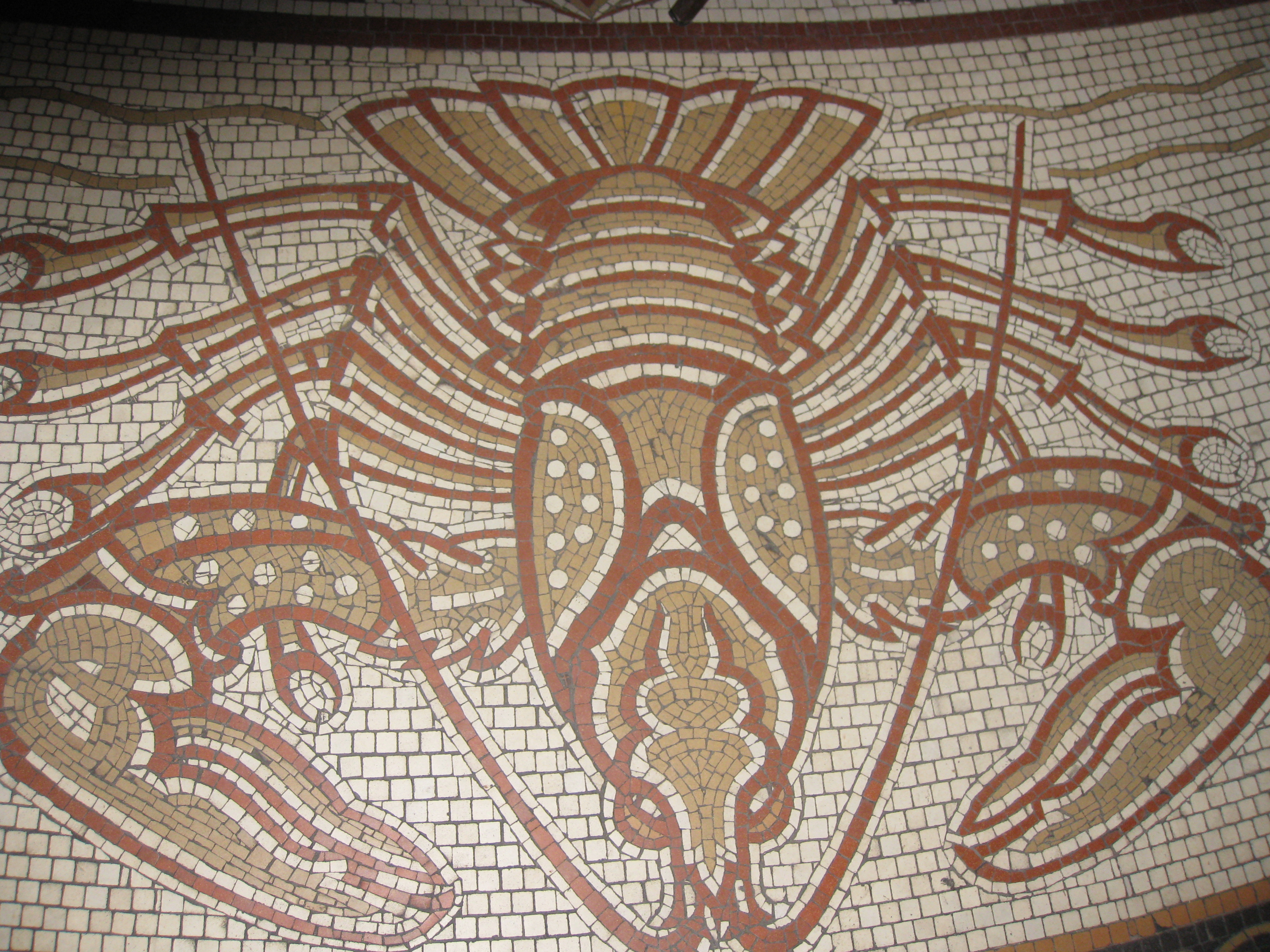
- Mosaic in the abbey of Hagia Maria
  The 12th century Romanesque church of St. Austremonius in Issoire, France, in which reliefs with the figures of the Zodiac appear. The shape of Cancer is reminiscent of a crayfish, but the grotesque appearance is closer to a gargoyle.
- The 13th century Gothic cathedral of Chartres, France, in which one of the main doors has reliefs with the zodiacal signs surrounding the figure of Christ. In addition, there is a stained glass window in the interior in which these motifs also appear. Cancer appears in the form of a sea crab.
- The 13th century Gothic cathedral of Amiens, France, whose façade features reliefs with the signs of the Zodiac. Cancer appears in the form of a sea crab.
- The 13th century Gothic cathedral of St. Peter in Bautzen, Germany, in which a wooden staircase is decorated with the signs of the Zodiac.
- The Benedictine abbey of Hagia Maria, built on Mount Zion in Jerusalem in the early 20th century, where a circular mosaic with the figures of the Zodiac is preserved. Cancer appears in the form of a crayfish.

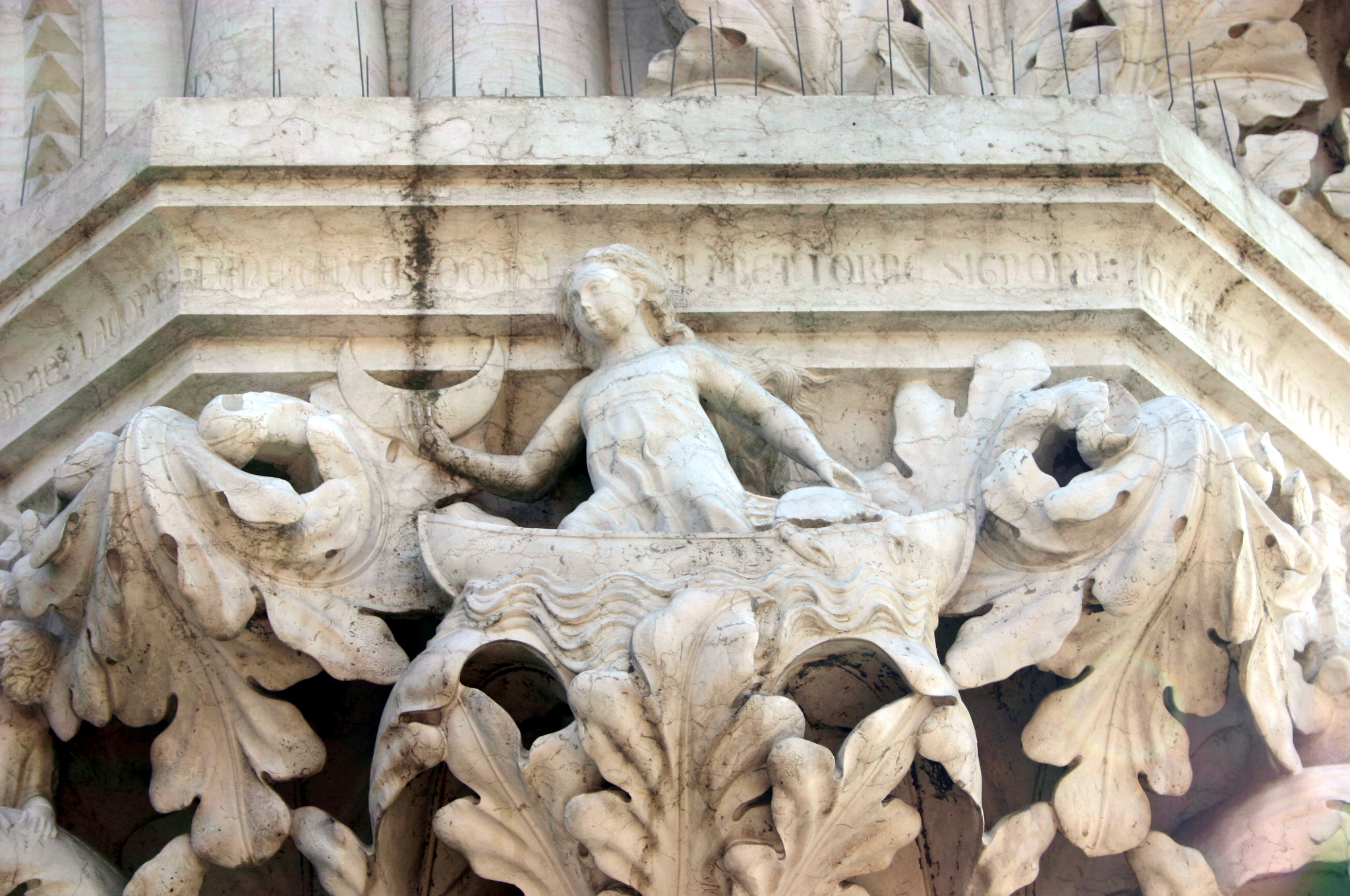
Capital of a column of the Doge's Palace in Venice

Another example can be seen in the Doge's Palace in Venice, a Gothic building next to San Marco Square used as a residence for the Doge, seat of government, court and prison. Part of the column capitals are decorated with motifs on the planets of the Solar System and signs of the Zodiac; in particular, one of them shows Cancer and the Moon, its ruling star. Cancer is represented as a sea crab while the Moon is a female figure, both on a boat.

In another field, the Lithuanian painter and composer Mikalojus Konstantinas Čiurlionis, belonging to modernism and symbolism, produced in 1907 a cycle of twelve paintings called Zodiakas (The Zodiac); Vėžys (Cancer) represented the sign of Carcinus, in the form of a crayfish.

=== Celestial charts ===
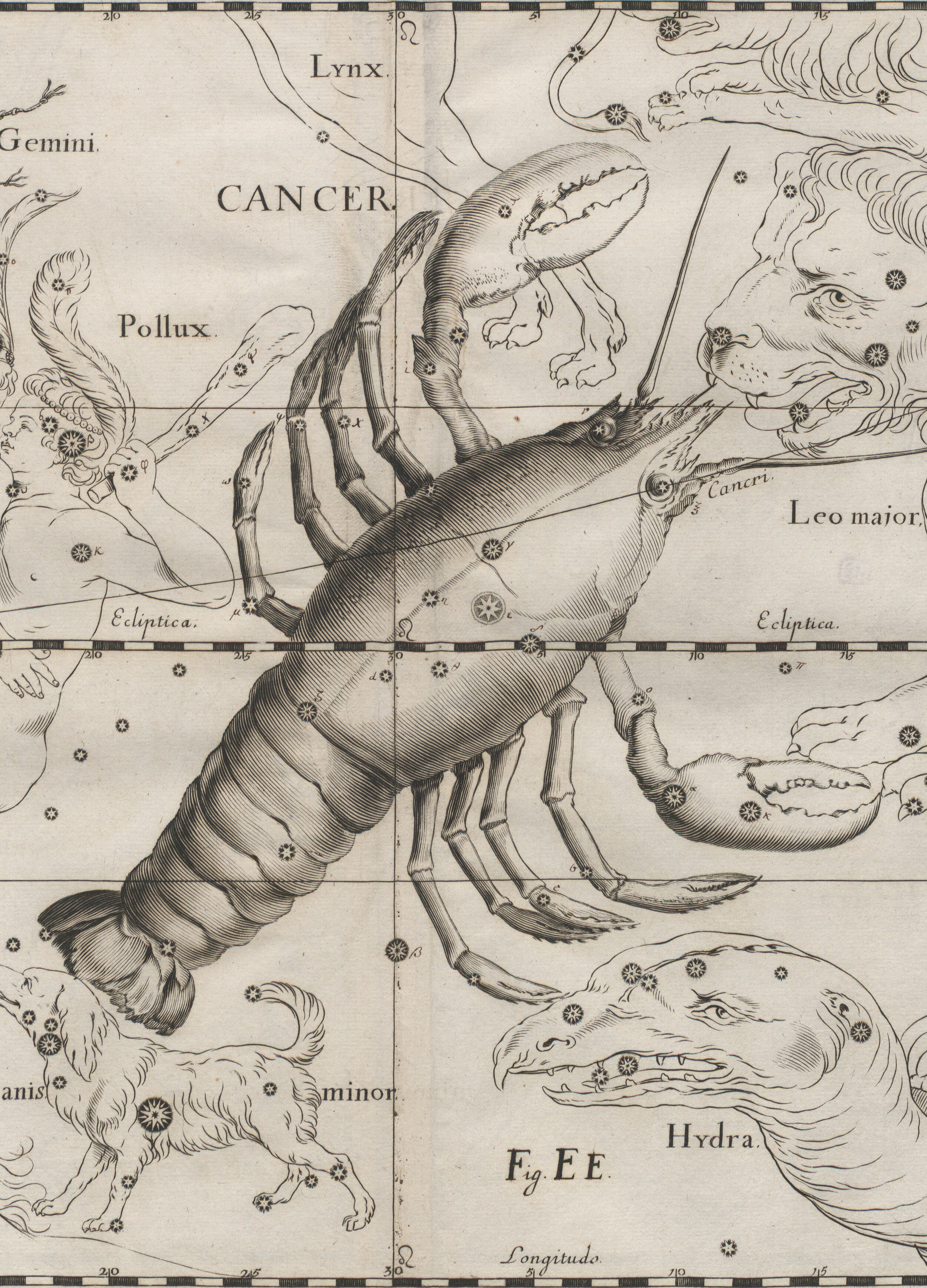
Constellation of Cancer according to Hevelius

Celestial charts depict the distribution of the main astronomical objects visible from Earth. These maps, which had their peak between the 15th and 19th centuries, are often decorated with figures that help to interpret or recognize the constellations shown. Some examples of the most relevant charts are listed below:

- The Arabic manuscript Kitab al-Bulhan, by Abd al-Hasan Al-Isfahani, compiled in the late 14th century, deals with astrology, astronomy and geomancy. Cancer is represented as a crayfish.
- Uranometria, published in 1603 by the German astronomer Johann Bayer; notable for being the first work to depict the complete celestial sphere. Cancer is represented as a crayfish.
- Firmamentum Sobiescianum, by the Polish astronomer Johannes Hevelius; it was published posthumously in 1690 and added seven new constellations to those recognized at the time. Cancer is depicted as a crayfish.

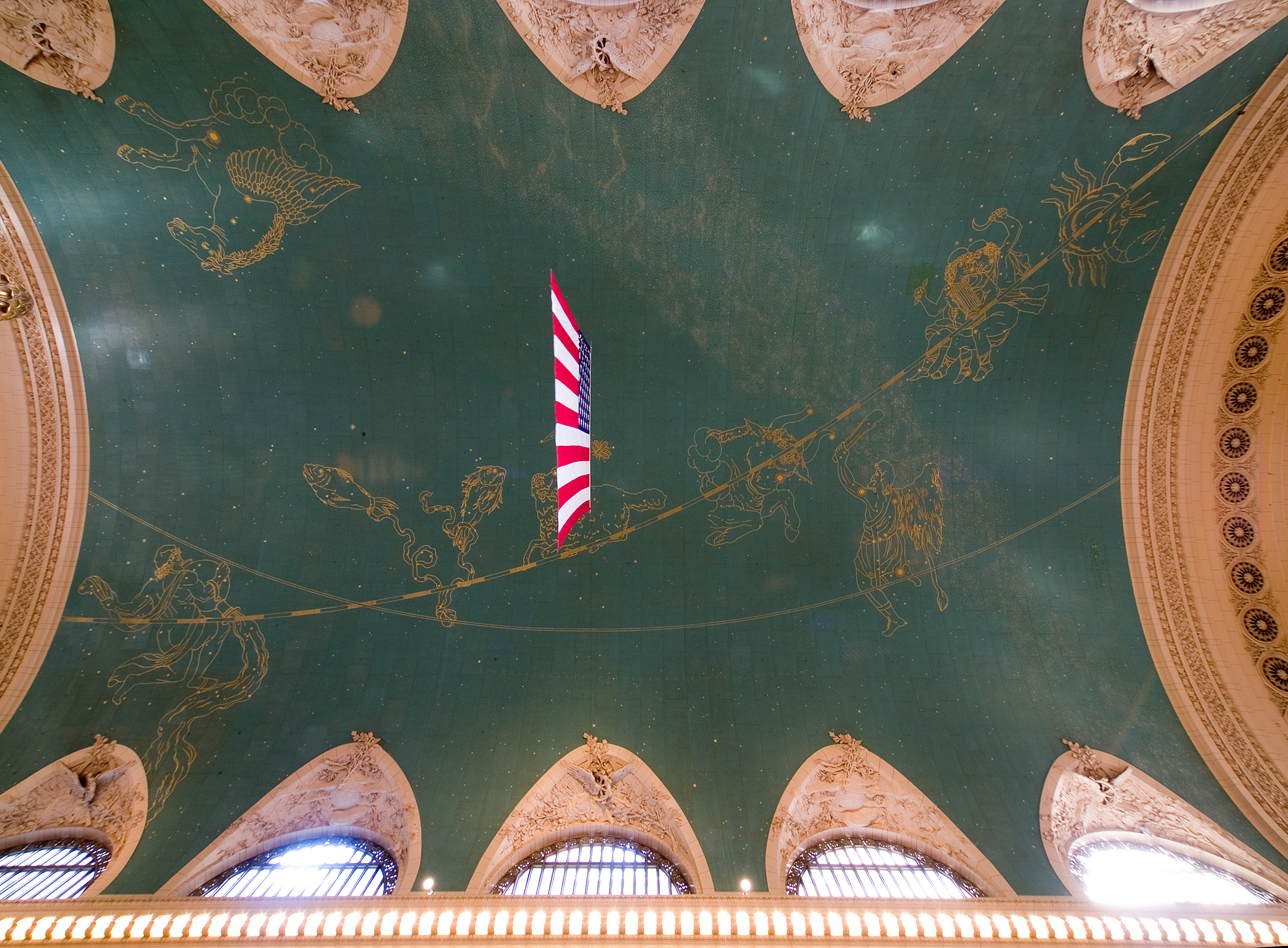
Ceiling of Grand Central Terminal station in New York City

- Uranographia, by the German astronomer Johann Elert Bode; published in 1801 and said to mark the end of the trend of charts that combined scientific rigor with artistic quality, beginning to differentiate texts intended for professionals from those for amateurs in the field. Cancer is represented as a crayfish.

A special case is the ceiling of Grand Central Terminal in New York City, painted in 1912 by the Frenchman Paul César Helleu, showing part of a celestial chart. In 1998, after twelve years of restoration work at the station, this work could be seen again after decades of going unnoticed because it had been obscured by smoke.

== Other influences ==
The main influence derived from the myth of Carcinus has been to serve as a name for the constellation of Cancer and its Zodiac sign. On the other hand, the character is not related to the celestial body of the Crab Nebula and its Pulsar, located in the constellation of Taurus; it was in the 1840s when William Parsons, English astronomer and aristocrat, referred to the nebula as "of the Crab", due to the resemblance of a drawing he made of it with a crustacean.

On the influences received, the American polymath Richard Hinckley Allen exposes in his work Star Names: Their Lore and Meaning (1899) that the constellation of Cancer was also identified by other peoples, apart from the Greek and later ones, with a crab:

The constellation was known as Cherjengh and Kalakang to the Persians; Lenkutch, to the Turks; Sartono, to the Syrians and perhaps to the later Chaldeans; Sarṭān, to the Hebrews; and Al Saraṭān, to the Arabs; all terms equivalent to Cancer.

— R. H. Allen, Star Names: Their Lore and Meaning, p. 108

Paul Jensen relates it to the Babylonian turtle of the 4th millennium BC, and it has also been associated with the Egyptian Scarabaeus sacer of the 2nd millennium BC. The first references to a crab appear during the Mesopotamian Kassite dynasty, c. 1530–1160 BC, and already clearly in the Mul-Apin tablets, c. 1100–700 BC, as Al-lul.

However, no clear origin or influences on the character have come down to the present day, beyond the hypothesis of creation by ancient astrologers to associate the constellations of the Ecliptic with the twelve labors of Heracles, introducing into the Hydra myth the minor character of the crab with which to take advantage of the figure traditionally recognized in the constellation.

== See also ==
- Labours of Hercules
- Lernaean Hydra
- Cancer (constellation)
- Cancer (astrology)

== Bibliography ==
- Sanz Morales, Manuel (2002). Mitógrafos griegos (in Spanish). Ediciones Akal.
- Graves, Robert (1955). Los mitos griegos II. pp. 73–75. Archived from the original on 11 February 2011.
- Frazer, James George (1921). Apollodorus, The Library.
- Grimal, Pierre (1981). Dictionnaire de la mythologie grecque et romaine.
- Senra Varela, Avelino (2002). El cáncer: epidemiología, etiología, diagnóstico y prevención. (in Spanish). Elsevier Science.
