= Agriculture in ancient Greece =

Part of the economy of ancient Greece

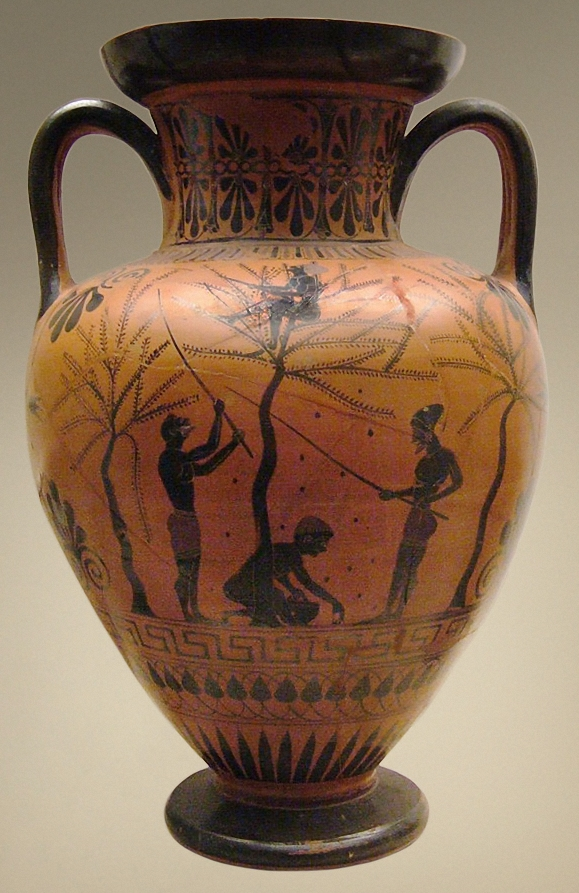
Harvesting olives. British Museum

Agriculture was central in the economy of ancient Greece, as it comprised the bulk of production and exchange. Nearly 80% of the population was involved in this activity.

== Background ==
=== Written sources ===
The earth willingly teaches righteousness to those who can learn; for the better she is served, the more good things she gives in return.

— Xenophon, Oeconomicus 5.12

Most texts in the ancient Greek language about agriculture are lost, except two botany texts by Theophrastus (Historia Plantarum or Enquiry into Plants and On the Causes of Plants, both written c. 350~287 BCE), and Hesiod's poem Works and Days (c. 700 BCE). In addition, Oeconomicus (from which book title the modern science of economics took its name), written by Xenophon around 360 BCE, is a Socratic dialogue principally about household management and agriculture.

The main texts are mostly from the Roman agronomists: Cato the Elder's De agri cultura, Columella's De re rustica, Marcus Terentius Varro and Palladius. Varro mentions at least fifty Greek authors whose works are now lost, such as the agricultural treatise Rusticatio (attributed to Mago the Carthaginian, originally written in Punic and later translated into Greek and Latin). Scholars speculate whether this text may have been an early source for agricultural traditions in the Near East and Classical world. Ancient Greek agronomy was also influenced by Babylonian agriculture through the work of 4th-century writer Vindonius Anatolius, who in turn influenced the 7th-century writer Cassianus Bassus. Bassus' Eclogae de re rustica was excerpted in the Geoponika, a surviving Byzantine text created during the reign of Constantine VII Porphyrogenitus (r. 913–959) and later translated into Arabic, Syriac and Armenian. Some additional information on agriculture in Roman Greece may be found in Pliny the Elder's encyclopaedia Natural History (77–79 CE).

Other than that, indirect evidence about the kind of food the ancient Greeks produced and traded might be inferred from mentions of dietary practices in literary texts, such as the Odyssey and Iliad, or more historical narratives such as the History of the Peloponnesian War by Thucydides. Yet, using such written sources about food to hypothesise about agriculture comes with a high level of uncertainty.

=== Archaeological record ===
Aside from written sources, archaeology plays an important role in establishing facts and hypotheses around agricultural practices in ancient Greece. On the one hand, human-made tools that have been found may indicate what kinds of crops were grown, how the soil was cultivated, what kind of animal husbandry was practiced where and for what of purposes animals were kept. On the other hand, archaeobotany searches for remains of plants, charcoal, charred seeds and fruits present in stratigraphical layers of ancient settlements, and studies how their inhabitants probably used them in their lives.

For all attempts to match discoveries made by archaeobotanists with text-based sources, caution must be observed that the ancient Greek and Roman terminology used may be difficult to match with modern plant taxonomy's Greco-Latin botanical nomenclature. Kiel University archaeobotanist Helmut J. Kroll (2000) warned:

Whether a Greek plant name describes a species, a variety or a special landrace of a species is not sure. For example sesame has often been mentioned in texts since Linear B. Archaeobotanical reports of Sesamum indicum in contrast are missing or of very young date. On the other hand, there is a Bronze and Iron Age oil plant, Gold-of-pleasure or false flax Camelina sativa, of great importance in Middle Europe down to Northern Greece, which has no name in Greek literature, although Latin camelina is etymologically connected with Greek chamaelinon. Names shift from one species to another, early sesame may be Camelina sativa; in late Hellenistic times it is surely Sesamum indicum. The cooperation between botanists and classical philologists should be better, or, at best, some philologists should be hobby-botanists.

Differing ways of processing various products result in different kinds of remains that may be rediscovered and analysed. Kroll: "Hulled wheats have to be dehusked, winnowed et cetera before preparing a meal. A lot of residue is connected with these processes. The residues were often burnt and lots of charred plant remains are the result[.] So emmer and einkorn may get charred to a greater extent than bread wheat which is put into the granary and into the pot or onto the millstone without any further processing." This means that the archaeobonatical evidence is not always representative of which crops people in the past actually cultivated and consumed, and common wheat (bread wheat) is underrepresented in the archaeological record of ancient Greece. For similar reasons, common wheat (bread wheat) and durum wheat (macaroni wheat) are often difficult distinguish in practice.

== Agricultural products ==
According to Kroll (2000), evidence from mainland Greece in the 1st millennium BCE suggests "crops of the arable land can be grouped in cereals, millets, pulses, oil and fiber plants and in fruit trees."

=== Cereals ===
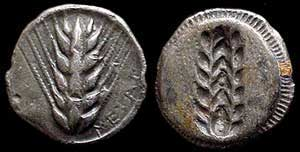
An ear of barley, symbol of wealth in the city of Metapontum in Magna Graecia (i.e. the Greek colonies of southern Italy), stamped stater, c. 530–510 BCE

Amongst cereals, about 7 or 8 different sorts could be distinguished:

1. hulled barley (Hordeum vulgare *vulgare); "naked barley Hordeum vulgare *nudum occurs only in Chalcolithic contexts");
2. emmer (Triticum dicoccum),
3. einkorn (Triticum monococcum);
4. spelt (Triticum spelta),
5. common/bread wheat (Triticum aestivum) and durum/macaroni wheat (Triticum durum); "these two [are] often put together as naked or freethreshing wheats; emmer, einkorn and spelt are hulled wheats"),
6. oats (Avena species); and
7. rye (Secale cereale).

Of these, emmer and einkorn were the main cereals during Neolithic Greece (c. 7000 – c. 3200 BCE) and Bronze Age mainland (Helladic) Greece) (c. 3200 – c. 1050 BCE). Emmer and einkorn were primarily used for cooked meals, but are not as suitable for bread and pastry. While remains of pure einkorn are typically discovered in Northern Greece and pure emmer more in Central and Southern Greece, they have often been found together. Aside from them, hulled barley also served an important role in this early period (in ancient Greece and elsewhere in the Ancient Near East), as a sacred cereal used in religious offerings, or as the primary ingredient for flat bread, for paps, broses, and gruel.

In the Late Helladic III period (c. 1415–1050 BCE), mainland Greece transitioned from the Bronze to the Iron Age. In Iron Age Greece, "naked wheat replaces emmer and einkorn as the main cereal besides barley." By the end of the 1st millennium BCE, common wheat (bread wheat) had become the main cereal of Greece and the Greek colonies. This species of cereal is very apt for baking (hence the nickname "bread wheat"), and in 1st-millennium BCE mainland Greece, "the bread oven in the yard or in a special room [was] a characteristic feature of every household." By contrast, ovens were rare in Bronze Age Greece, when hearths were still at the centre of domestic living.

Spelt was much rarer in the 1st millennium BCE, only found mixed with bread wheat in central and southern Greece, but more specifically cultivated in northern Greece in a small scale. Unlike in Bronze and Iron Age Central Europe, spelt, oats and rye have never been a main cereal in Greece. Of the latter two, there is not even evidence that humans ate it; oats and rye might have been used as livestock fodder instead. On the other hand, rye was commonly grown in the Pontus region on the southeastern Black Sea coast. It is possible that rye became a main cereal in the Byzantine period in Thrace, northern Greece and Chalkidiki, but the evidence is limited.

During the early time of Greek history, as shown in the Odyssey, Greek agriculture - and diet - was based on cereals (sitos, though usually translated as wheat, could in fact designate any type of cereal grain). Even if the ancients were aware of the better nutritional value of wheat, the growing of barley was less demanding and more productive. Attempts have been made to calculate Attica grain production in the period, but results have not been conclusive. It did not take long for demand to outpace production capabilities, as arable land was limited. The "tightness" of the land (στενοχωρία / stenokhôría) also explains Greek colonization, and the importance Anatolian cleruchies would have for the Athenian empire in controlling grain provision.

=== Fruit and vegetables ===
Grapes, from the Vitis vinifera flowering plant, have been commonly grown in settlements throughout Greece since the Late Neolithic Dimini culture (c. 4800~3200 BCE), long before the introduction of the cultivated olive tree Olea europaea in the Late Bronze Age. Grapes do well in the rocky soil, but demand a lot of care. There is a lot of variety in grape pips found throughout prehistoric and classical Greece, and it is difficult to determine when and where grape vines were cultivated, or where wine was collected from the wild. Likewise, it is impossible to determine where the so-called "wine–beer border" was in southeastern Europe; wine was made from grapes, and beer from malt using barley, and remains from both plants can be found everywhere throughout the soil layers of Greece from the 1st millennium BCE.

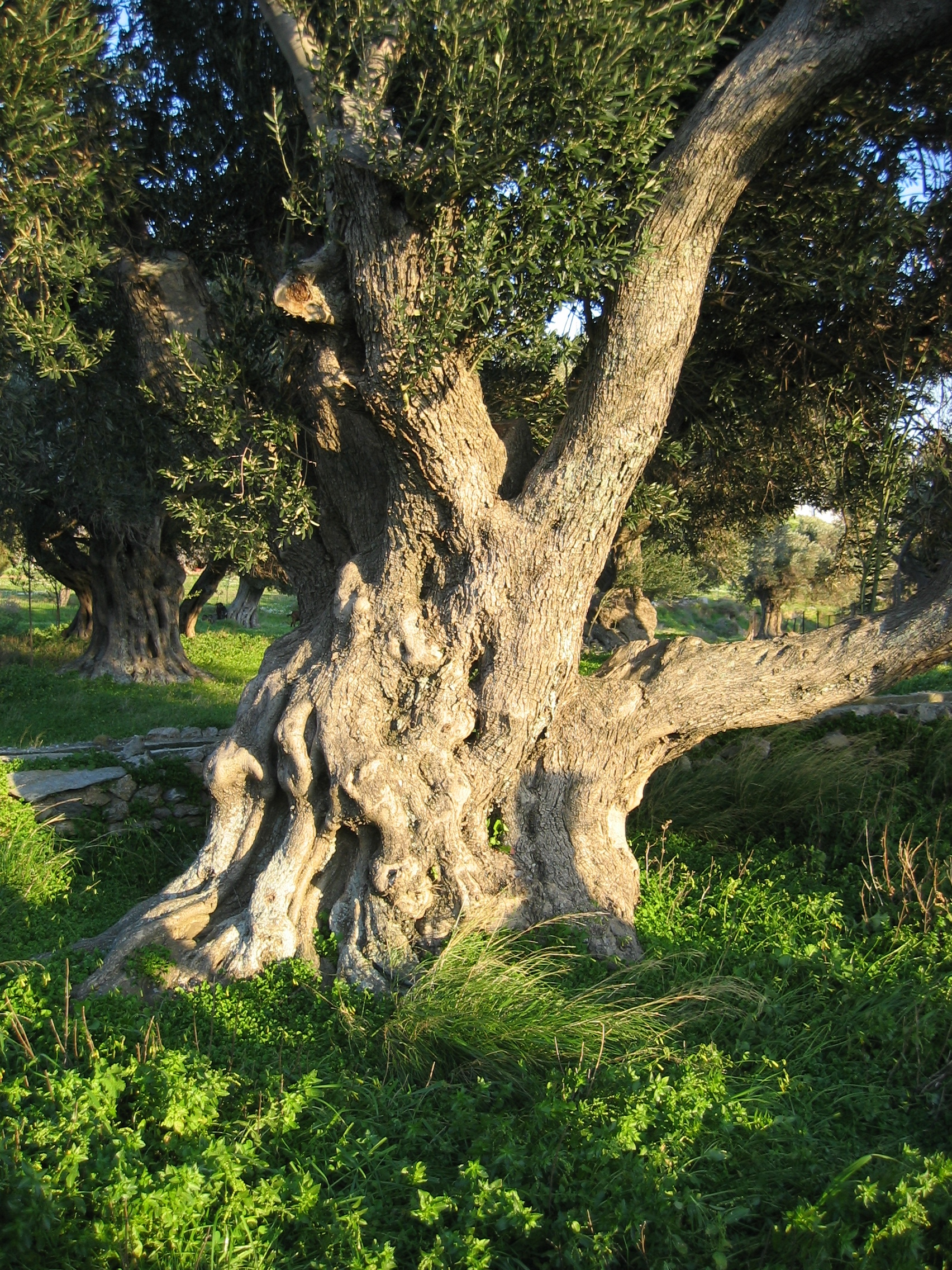
An olive tree in Karystos, Euboea

The Mediterranean coasts of central and southern Greece were well suited for olive trees, out of which olive oil could be made. Olive plantations are a long-term investment: it takes more than twenty years for the tree to provide fruit, and it only fruits every other year. Although the wild olive species Olea oleaster was native to the Mediterranean, it would be the Olea europaea, probably first cultivated in the Levant, that was introduced for large-scale arboriculture in Mycenaean Greece in the Late Bronze Age. According to Greek mythology, it was the goddess Pallas Athena who brought the cultivated olive to the Athenians, and taught them how to mill and press the olives for oil. Archaeobotanist Helmut J. Kroll (2000) stated that olives and olive oil were probably too precious to be traded on a large scale, as there is no evidence of olive pips in Thessaly, the mountains of Epirus, Macedon, and Thrace, outside the range of cultivation of olive trees near the Mediterranean coast. If anything, it was a rare, expensive, luxury product; in the inland regions where olives could not be grown, they were not imported, but replaced by flax (linseed), Camelina sativa (false flax) and poppy instead. (Note: "But the olive tree does not tolerate frost, wants to overlook the Mediterranean Sea, wants to smell the soft, moist and salty air and will not thrive far from the coast and in the north. In Thessaly, Macedonia and Thrakia, in the Epirus mountains, linseed, false flax and poppy replace the olive tree as source for vegetal fat. Outside the range of olive cultivation olive pips do not occur, neither in Kastanas nor in Assiros nor in Agios Mamas, nor in inner Thessaly. Inside this range they are common in every settlement. So there was surely no trade with olives; if olive oil was traded in amphores, it must have been very expensive, a luxury good but not an ingredient of daily bread.")

Oil-seed plants such as flax (linseed), sesame, and poppy were also grown. Additional vegetables included cabbage, onion, and garlic. Orchards included those of fig, almond, apple, and pear trees.

=== Legumes ===
Legumes were essential to the Greek diet, and were harvested in the Mediterranean region from prehistoric times: the earliest and most common being lentils - which have been found in archeological sites in Greece dating to the Upper Paleolithic period. As one of the first domesticated crops to be introduced to Greece, lentils are commonly found at regional archaeological sites from the Upper Paleolithic.

Lentils and chickpeas are the most frequently mentioned legumes in classical literature.

- Bitter vetch – This plant was present in Greece from at least 8000 BCE, and was occasionally eaten in Classical times. Most ancient literature that mentions it describes it as animal food and having a disagreeable taste. Several classical authors suggest medicinal uses for it.
- Black beans – Homer mentions the threshing a black bean (not black turtle beans) as a metaphor in the Iliad
- Broad beans – Broad, or Fava Beans are rare in archeological sites, but are common in classical literature. They were eaten both as main dishes and also included in desserts (mixed with figs). In addition to describing them as food, classical authors attribute various medicinal qualities to the beans.
- Chickpeas – Chickpeas are mentioned almost as frequently in classical literature as lentils (by Aristophanes and Theophrastus among others), but are found rarely in archeological sites in Greece. As they are found in prehistoric sites in the Middle East and India, it is likely their use was a late addition to the Ancient Greek diet
- Grass peas – Like bitter vetch, grass peas were grown in ancient Greece mainly for animal fodder, however they were occasionally eaten in times of famine
- Lentils – Theophrastus states that "of the leguminous plants, the lentil is the most prolific"
- Lupin bean – Lupin (or Lupine, Lupini) beans were present in the Mediterranean region from prehistoric times and were cultivated in Egypt by at least 2000 BCE. By classical times, the Greeks were using them for both food and animal fodder.
- Garden peas – Peas are commonly found in some of the earliest archaeological sites in Greece, but are rarely mentioned in classical literature. However Hesiod and Theophrastus both include them as food eaten by Greeks

=== Herbs ===
Herb gardens in ancient Greece often included sage, mint, thyme, savory, and oregano.

=== Animal husbandry ===
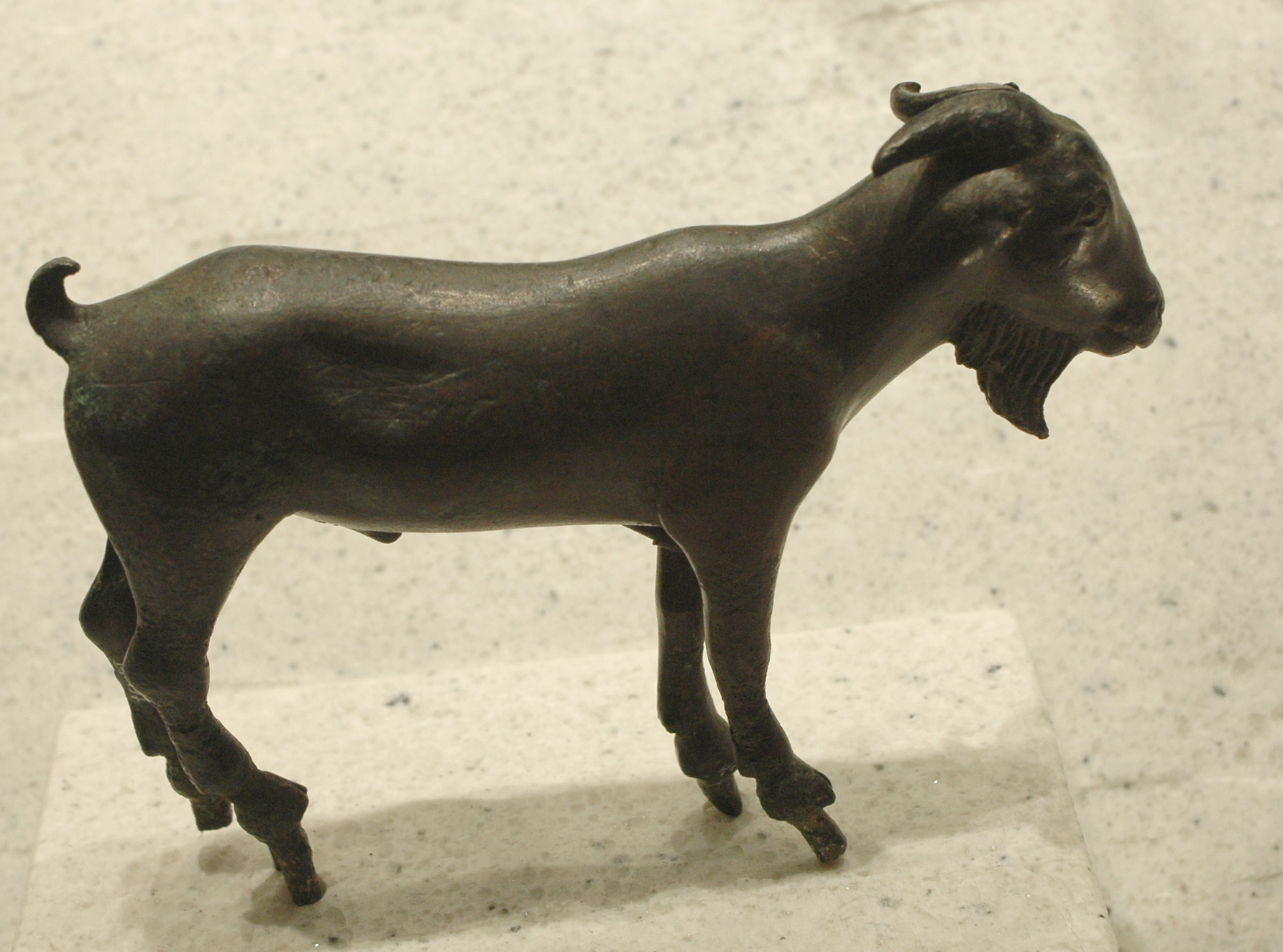
Bronze billygoat found in the deme of Kephissia, 5th century BCE, Louvre

Animal husbandry, seen as a sign of power and wealth in the works of Homer, was in fact not well developed in ancient Greece. While the Mycenaean civilization was familiar with the rearing of cattle, the practice was restricted as a result of geographic expansion into less suitable terrain. Goats and sheep quickly became the most common livestock; less difficult to raise and providers of meat, wool, and milk (usually in the form of cheese). Pork and poultry (chicken and geese) were also raised. Oxen were rare and normally used as a work animal, though they were occasionally used as sacrificial animals (see Hecatomb). Donkeys, mules and their mixes were raised as pack or draught animals.

Horses were raised on the plains of Thessaly and Argolis; it was a luxury animal, signifying aristocracy. The Clouds, ancient Greek comedy by Aristophanes, illustrates the equestrian snobbery of Athenian aristocrats: Pheidippides, the son of the hero is addicted to race-horses and so ruins his father Strepsiades.

It is likely that most farms practiced some limited animal husbandry; poultry or small animals grazing on waste land or fed kitchen scraps. Combined farm/livestock operations also existed, as well as those specializing in livestock. An inscription also mentions a certain Eubolos of Elateia, in Phocis, the owner of 220 head of cattle and horses and at least 1000 sheep and goats. Flocks of sheep were herded between the valley in winter and the mountains in summer. Taxes existed for the transit or stopover of flocks in cities.

Cows were also sometimes raised, although they were not as common as other farm animals.

=== Forestry ===
Recent archaeological work is changing a long-standing view of the impact of agriculture on the land in Greece. The evidence mounts for episodes of deforestation and catastrophic soil erosion over the past 8,000 years. Many scholars believe they resulted from a long history of human land use and abuse.

— Curtis Runnels (1995)

Wood was exploited on a large scale; an estimated 90% of all wood and its carbonised product, charcoal, was used as a fuel in ancient Greece and Rome. The second-most important purpose of wood was to serve as building materials for buildings and ships. Homes and wagons were made of wood as was the ard (aratron).

The continuous exploitation of forests in the ancient Greek countryside led to serious deforestation, particularly around major urban and mining centres, increasingly necessitating timber trade to acquire lumber from other forests elsewhere around the Mediterranean Sea. The Greek forests located in the highlands were denuded by goats and charcoal production; it was not long before it had to be imported especially for ship production (see trireme). Another driving factor of deforestation was land clearance for the purpose of farming. By Plato's time (5th–4th century BCE), the environs of Athens had been mostly deforested, while the forests of the island of Euboea were stripped almost entirely of accessible wood to fuel the industrial silver mining complex of Laurion in southern Attica, providing only inferior timber thereafter.

The ancient Greeks and Romans undertook several responses in order to mitigate or counter the effects of deforestation and soil erosion, such as reforestation, afforestation, and the establishment of various sacred groves as forests that were not to be altered, and where woodchopping, acquiring wood from dead branches or fallen trees, making fires, or hunting animals was strictly prohibited.

=== Other products ===
Beekeeping provided honey, the only source of sugar known to the Greeks. It also was used in medicines and in the production of mead. The ancient Greeks did not have access to sugarcane. The Hymettus region of Attica was known for the quality of honey produced there. Wax was also produced, used in the lost wax process to produce bronze statues as well as in medicines.

Bronze was used for farm tools and weaponry.

== Agricultural work ==
=== Literary descriptions ===
"First, Ischomachus, I think I should be glad to learn, for this is the philosopher's way, how I am to cultivate the land if I want to get the heaviest crops of wheat (πυροὺς) and barley (κριθὰς) out of it."

— Socrates in Xenophon's Oeconomicus 16.9

Hesiod's Works and Days (c. 700 BCE) and Xenophon's Oeconomicus (c. 360 BCE) provide information about working off the land. According to Oeconomicus Chapters 16.8–19.19, Socrates (who is not historically known to have set good practical examples of household management in his own life, and "who has never spent a moment involved in farming") recalls a past conversation with an Athenian gentleman-farmer (kaloskagathos) named Ischomachus. The latter asserts everyone already knows the basics of agriculture (20.2–11), and leads Socrates to discover all the essentials of good farming on his own.

=== Seasonal dynamics ===
The olive harvest took place from late autumn to the beginning of winter, either by hand or by pole. They were placed in wicker baskets and left to ferment for a few weeks before being pressed. The screw press, although referred to as the Greek press by Pliny the Elder (XVIII, 37) was a late (2nd century BCE) Roman invention. Oil was preserved in terra cotta vases for use later. This was also the time for pruning of trees and vines and harvesting of legumes.

Spring was the rainy season; farmers took advantage of this to bring fallow ground back into production. They have usually been thought to have practised biennial crop rotation, alternating from year to year between fallow and cultivated, though Paul Halstead suggests that alternating between growing cereals and pulses is more likely. Attempts to introduce triennial crop rotation with legumes in the third year, ran into problems due to the poor Greek soil, lack of power, and absence of mechanization. The Greeks did not use animal manure, possibly due to the low number of cattle. The only soil additive was weeds ploughed back into the ground after fields came out of fallow.

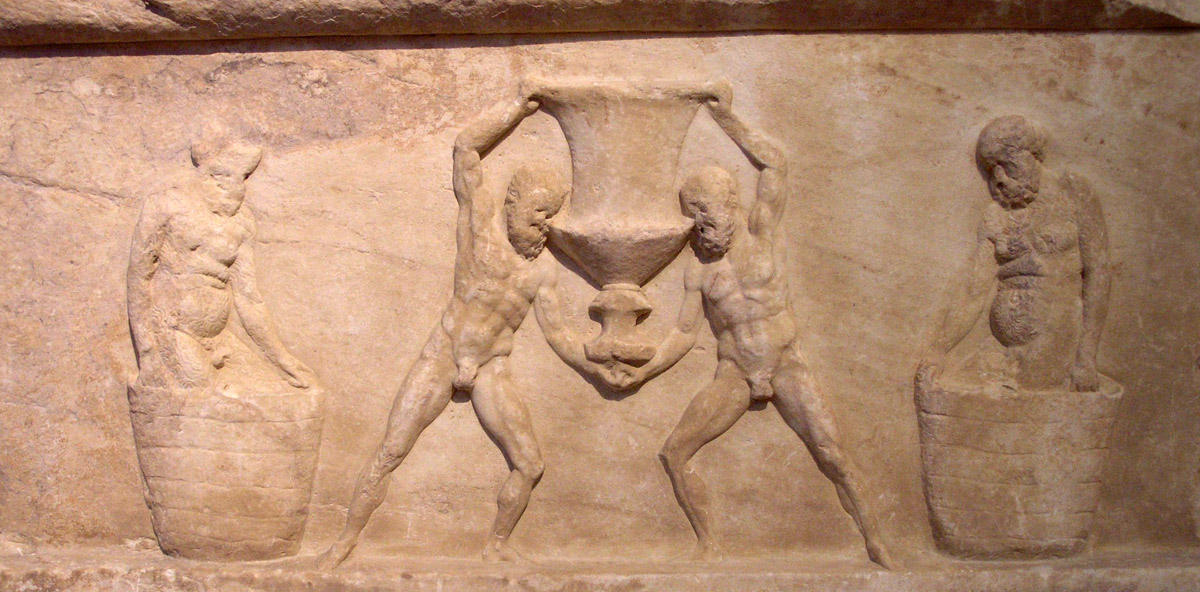
Satyrs making wine, Dionysian bas-relief from altar of unknown date, National Archaeological Museum of Athens

In summer, irrigation was indispensable. In June, they harvested with sickles; the scythe was not used. Wheat was threshed with animal power; it was trampled by oxen, donkeys or mules, and the grain stored. Women and slaves ground it and made bread.

In early autumn, they collected deadfall and prepared supplies of firewood; while winters were mild on the coast they could be brutal in the highlands. Farmers also had to break the hard crust that had formed over the summer on grain fields. To do this required three passes since the ard was wooden (metal shares were rare) and only scratched the uppermost subsoil without inverting it. A hoe and mallet were also used to break clumps of earth. The fallow land for next year was sown by hand. This was the time of the grape harvest: the grapes were crushed by foot in large vats, then the wine was left to ferment in jugs. After that process, people could drink the ambrosial wine and enjoy it.

In the nearly four centuries that passed between Hesiod and Xenophon, no improvements can be found in agriculture. Tools remained mediocre and there were no inventions to lighten the work of either man or animal. It was not until the rise of Romans that the water mill came into wide use, employing hydraulic power to augment muscle power. It took until the Middle Ages for true plows which turned the earth to be widely adopted. Neither irrigation, nor soil improvements, nor animal husbandry saw notable advances. Only the very richest of land, such as that of Messinia was capable of supporting two crops per year.

=== Forced labour ===
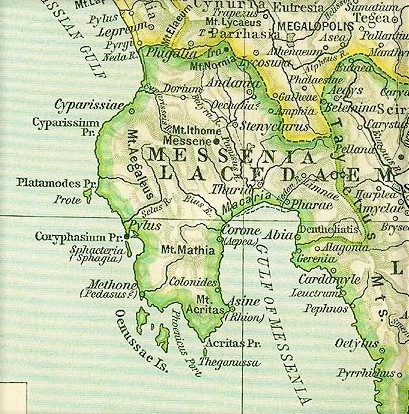
Messenia, subjected by the Spartiates, where most of their helots were forced to work in agricultural serfdom.

In Sparta, the reforms of Lycurgus (c. 800 BCE) led to a drastic redistribution of land, with 10 to 18 hectare lots (kleroi) distributed to each citizen. However, most inhabitants of Archaic and Classical Sparta (Lakedaimon) were not citizens, but helots in a position commonly likened to serfdom or slavery. Their exact origins and status are unclear and debated, but a common theory suggests that many helots were originally free inhabitants of Messenia and other regions, subjected by the Spartiates at the end of the First Messenian War (743–724 BCE). Sources suggest they were state-owned, land-bound serfs, who could not be bought or sold as the property of individual Spartiates, but were forced to work for them by the Lakedaimon state, mostly in agricultural work. A large percentage of their produce had to be handed over to their Spartiate overlords. On several occasions, the helots rose in revolt against their Spartiates oppressors, but unsuccessfully, amidst much suffering and costs. It was not until the end of the Theban–Spartan War (378–362 BCE) that most helots were liberated from agricultural serfdom by the Theban commander Epaminondas. The penestai in Thessaly held a similar status to the helots of Sparta.

== Agricultural property ==
With the exception of Athens, and a few areas where aerial surveys have permitted analysis of historical land distribution, agricultural property allocation is not well known. Before the 5th century BCE, it is certain that the land belonged to great landowners, such as the Attican Eupatrides. Nevertheless, land use varied regionally; in Attica domains were divided among smaller plots, whereas in Thessaly they had single tenants.

From the 8th century BCE, tensions grew between the great landowners and the peasants, who were finding it more and more difficult to survive. This can probably be explained by population growth brought on by reduced infant mortality, and aggravated by the practice of equally subdividing land amongst several inheritors each generation (attested to by both Homer and Hesiod). In Athens, the crisis was resolved with the arrival of Solon in 594 BCE. He forbade slavery for debt and introduced other measures intended to help the peasants. In the 5th century BCE, the practice of liturgy (λειτουργία / leitourgia - literally, "public work") placed the responsibility for provision of public services heavily on the shoulders of the rich, and led to a reduction in large scale land ownership. It is estimated that most citizens of hoplite rank owned around 5 hectares of land. Elsewhere, tyrants undertook redistributions of land seized from wealthy political enemies.

From the 4th century BCE onwards property starts to become concentrated among few land owners, including in Sparta where according to Aristotle, the land has passed into the hands of a few (Politics, II, 1270a). Nevertheless, the aristocratic estates in Greece never achieved the scope of the great Roman latifundia; during the classical period, the wealthy Alcibiades possessed only 28 hectares (Plato, 1 Alcibiades, 123c). In all cases, land remains intimately associated with the concept of wealth. The father of Demosthenes possessed 14 talents and for land owned only a home, but he was the exception. When the banker Pasion made his fortune, he hurried to buy land.

Some Greek land was public and/or sacred. Each city possessed such land and it is estimated that in Athens during the classical period these lands represented a tenth of cultivable land. This was an administrative division and the property of the city itself (for example in Attica, it was a deme) or a temple. These lands were leased to individuals.

== See also ==
- Ancient Greek cuisine
- Economy of ancient Greece
- History of agriculture

== Bibliography ==
- Danzig, Gabriel (2003). "Why Socrates was Not a Farmer: Xenophon's Oeconomicus as a Philosophical Dialogue". Greece & Rome. 50 (1). Cambridge University Press: 57–76. doi:10.1093/gr/50.1.57. ISSN 0017-3835. JSTOR 3567820.
- Flint-Hamilton, Kimberly B. (July 1999). "Legumes in Ancient Greece and Rome: Food, Medicine, or Poison?". Hesperia. 68 (3): 371–385. JSTOR 148493.
- Hughes, J. Donald; Thirgood, J. V. (1982). "Deforestation, Erosion, and Forest Management in Ancient Greece and Rome". Journal of Forest History. 26 (2). Forest History Society, American Society for Environmental History, Forest History Society and The American Society for Environmental History, Oxford University Press: 60–75. doi:10.2307/4004530. ISSN 0094-5080. JSTOR 4004530.
- Hughes, J. Donald (2011). "Ancient Deforestation Revisited". Journal of the History of Biology. 44 (1). Springer: 43–57. doi:10.1007/s10739-010-9247-3. ISSN 0022-5010. JSTOR 41488387. PMID 20669043.
- Kroll, Helmut Johannes (2000). "Agriculture and Arboriculture in Mainland Greece at the Beginning of the First Millenium B.C." Pallas (52). Presses Universitaires du Midi: 61–68. ISSN 0031-0387. JSTOR 43606826.
- Marie-Claire Amouretti :
  - (in French) "L'agriculture de la Grèce antique. Bilan des recherches de la dernière décennie", Topoi. Orient-Occident, 4 (1994), p. 69–94,
  - (in French) Le Pain et l'huile dans la Grèce antique. De l'araire au moulin, Belles Lettres, Paris, 1986;
- (in French) Anne-Marie Buttin, La Grèce classique, Belles Lettres, coll. "Guide Belles Lettres des civilisations", 2002 (ISBN 2-251-41012-0);
- (in French) Marie-Claire Cauvin, Rites et rythmes agraires, Maison Orient-Méditerrannée, Lyon-Paris, 1991;
- (in French) Christophe Chandezon, L'élevage en Grèce (fin Ve - fin Ier S. a.C.): l'apport des sources épigraphiques..., Paris: De Boccard, 2003, 463 p. (ISBN 2-910023-34-6).
- (in French) Moses Finley, Le Problème de la terre en Grèce ancienne, Mouton, Paris-La Haye, 1975;
- Signe Isager and Jens E. Skydsgaard, Ancient Greek Agriculture: An Introduction, Routledge, 1995 (ISBN 0-415-11671-6);
- Léopold Migeotte :
  - (in French) L'économie des cités grecques, Ellipses, coll. « Antiquité : une histoire », Paris, 2002 (ISBN 2-7298-0849-3),
- Léopold Migeotte :
  - (in French) L'économie des cités grecques, Ellipses, coll. « Antiquité : une histoire », Paris, 2002 (ISBN 2-7298-0849-3),
  - (in French) L'emprunt public dans les cités grecques. Recueil des documents et analyse critique, éditions du Sphinx et Belles Lettres, Québec-Paris, 1984;
- (in French) Claude Mossé, Annie Schnapp-Gourbeillon, Précis d'histoire grecque, Armand Colin, coll. « U », 2003 (2nd ed) (ISBN 2-200-26562-X).
