= Asclepiades Pharmacion =

Ancient Greek physician

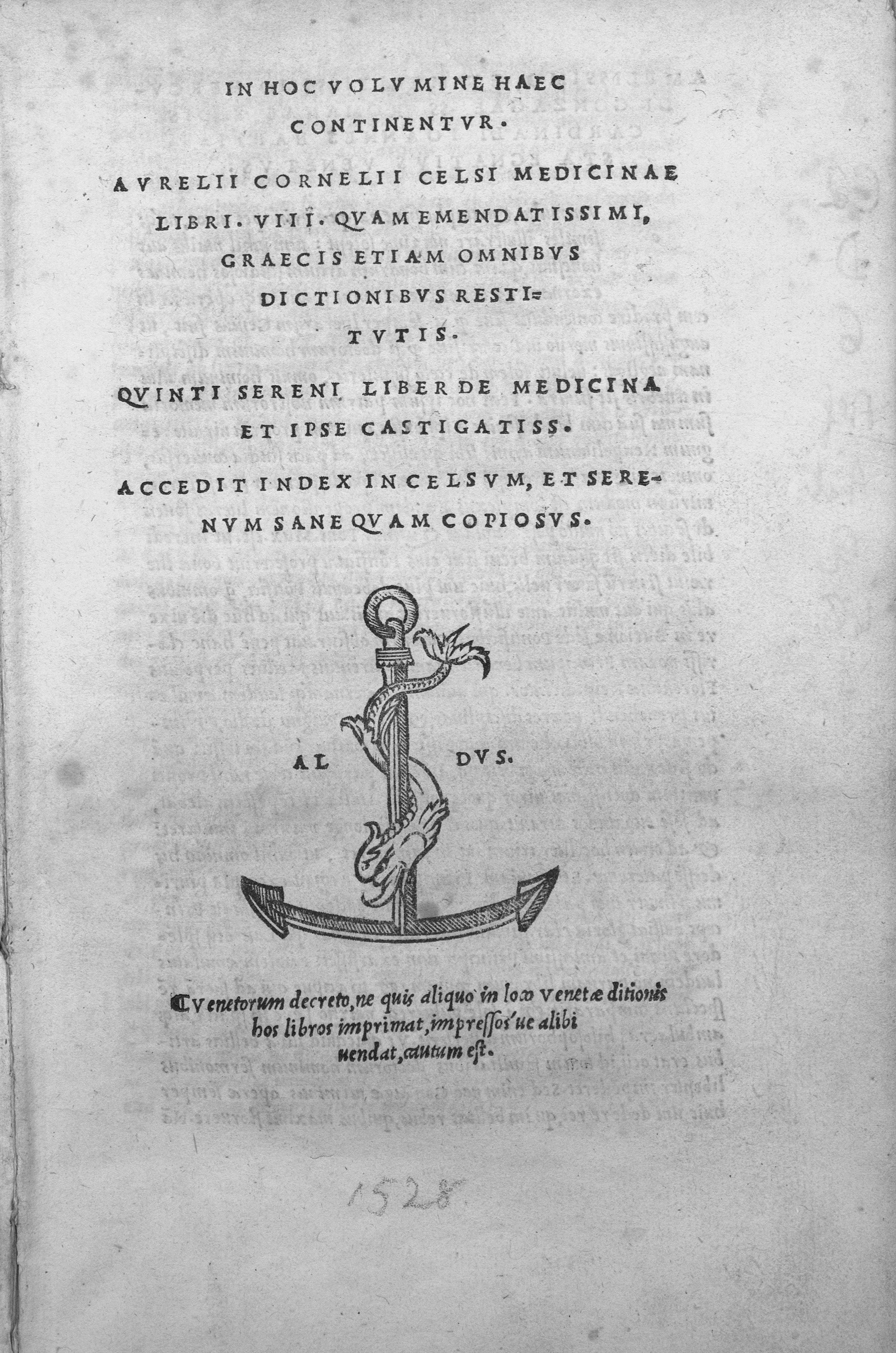
De medicina

Asclepiades Pharmacion or Asclepiades Junior (Greek: Ἀσκληπιάδης; fl. 1st–2nd century) was a Greek physician. He is believed to have lived at the end of the 1st or the beginning of the 2nd century AD, as he quotes Andromachus, Dioscorides, and Scribonius Largus, and is himself quoted by Galen. He derived his surname of Pharmacion from his skill and knowledge of pharmacy, on which subject he wrote a work in ten books, five on external remedies, and five on internal. Galen quotes this work very frequently, and generally with approbation. Elsewhere Galen refers to several other physicians named "Asclepiades", but his references to "Asclepiades Junior" (ὁ Νεωτερος) are generally believed to be the same as Pharmacion.

The encyclopedic arrangement of De Medicina by Aulus Cornelius Celsus follows the tripartite division of medicine established by Hippocrates and Asclepiades — diet, pharmacology, and surgery."
