= Passum =

Historical type of wine

Passum was a raisin wine (wine from semi-dried grapes) apparently developed in ancient Carthage (in now modern Tunisia) and transmitted from there to Italy, where it was popular in the Roman Empire. The earliest surviving instruction constitutes the only known Carthaginian recipe. It is a fragment from the Punic farming manual by Mago in its Latin translation by Decimus Junius Silanus in the 2nd century BC. It survives because it was summarised by Columella in the 1st century AD.

== Mago ==
A recipe for passum was recorded in an agricultural manual by Mago, a Punic writer. The original Punic work is lost, but the recipe is quoted in a later Latin work, De Agricultura by Columella.

Mago gives the following instructions for excellent passum. Harvest well-ripened very early bunches of grapes; reject any mildewed or damaged grapes. Fix in the ground forked branches or stakes not over four feet apart, linking them with poles. Lay reeds across them and spread the grapes on these in the sun, covering them at night to keep dew off. When they have dried, pick the grapes, put them in a fermenting vat or jar and add the best possible must (grape juice) so that they are just covered. When the grapes have absorbed it all and have swelled in six days, put them in a basket, press them and collect the passum. Next, tread the pressed grapes, adding very fresh must made from other grapes that have been sun-dried for three days. Mix all this and put the mixed mass through the press. Put this passum secundarium into sealed vessels immediately so that it will not become too austerum. After twenty or thirty days, when fermentation has ceased, rack into other vessels, seal the lids with gypsum and cover them with skins.

Later, less detailed, instructions are found in other Latin and Greek sources.

Passum was produced extensively in the eastern Mediterranean through the Roman period, and its popularity is referred to by Pliny the Elder in his Natural History. Research indicates that it found popularity amongst women in the kitchen, due to easy accessibility, in the medicinal world and also within religious contexts – possibly in Judaism and the early Christian eucharist.

"Passum de Magon" is a modern Tunisian natural sweet wine from Kelibia in the Cape Bon region, the traditional agricultural hub of Carthage, that honors the memory of Mago and is made in this antique fashion.

== See also ==
- Passito – the modern Italian wine made in this fashion. A notable passito comes from Pantelleria, an island in the Sicily Channel not far from the site of Carthage.
- Vin Santo – an Italian dessert wine made from dried grapes
