= Sabinus Tiro =

Ancient Roman writer

Sabinus Tiro was an author in ancient Rome, likely in the early first century, who wrote the book On Gardening, which is now lost. The book was dedicated to Maecenas. Other than this, nothing else is known about him. The horticultural topic of the book makes him part of the group of writers known as the geoponici.
