= Diophanes of Nicaea =

Diophanes of Nicaea or Diophanes the Bithynian (/daɪˈɒfəniːz/; Ancient Greek: Διοφάνης) was a Greek agricultural writer of the 1st century BC. He was a native of or associated with the city of Nicaea in Bithynia (northwestern Anatolia).

Diophanes abridged into six books the very lengthy farming manual by Cassius Dionysius, which extended to twenty books. Both works were entitled Georgika ("Agriculture"). Diophanes dedicated his work to king Deiotarus of Celtic Galatia in central Anatolia, southeast of his homeland.

According to Columella an amount equivalent to eight books of Cassius Dionysius' work, two-fifths of the whole, had been translated from a preceding work in Punic by Mago. Diophanes' work in turn must therefore have contained extensive extracts reflecting Punic agricultural practice.

Diophanes' abridgement was more popular in ancient times than Cassius Dionysius' original, but both works are now lost. Diophanes is quoted once by the Latin agricultural writer Varro, and several times in the Byzantine Greek compilation Geoponica. He was also cited by his fellow-Bithynian Florentinus. This is a partial list of surviving fragments:

- Planting by the phases of the moon.
- How to determine the soil quality of a farm.
- Use of rainwater.
- Predicting the kind and quality of wine that a vineyard will produce.
- Protecting vines from frost and from rust.
- Fencing a vineyard.
- Preparation and use of fermentation vats (pithoi).
- Wine new and old, white and red.
- Giving a good aroma to olive oil.
- Growing pistachios.
- Grafting apples.
- Growing pears.
- Suitability of different types of grafting.
- Growing bay from seed.
- Drying saffron.
- Killing prasokourides, a pest of leek crops.
- Dealing with scorpions.
- Honey and how to store it.
- Hunting wolves.
- Adding honey to wine for export.

== See also ==
- Diophanes of Mytilene – ancient Greek philosopher, rhetorician, and orator from the 2nd century BC.
