= Vindonius Anatolius =

Greek author of the 4th century AD

Vindonius Anatolius Berytius (Note: His first name is also spelled Vindanius or Vindanionius. "Berytius" means "of Beirut".) (Greek: Ανατόλιος ό Βηρύτιος), also known as Anatolius of Berytus, was a Phoenician author of the 4th century in Lebanon. He may be identical with the praetorian prefect of Illyricum mentioned by Ammianus Marcellinus.

He was the author of a "collection of agricultural practices" based on numerous earlier authors including Julius Africanus, pseudo-Democritus, pseudo-Apuleius, the Quinctilii, Florentinus and Tarentinus. Except for a few fragments, the work of Vindonius is lost. Evidence of its contents includes:

- It was the major source of the 6th-century work of Cassianus Bassus' Eclogae de re rustica, which is also lost but was excerpted in the Geoponica, a surviving 10th-century text.
- Photius included a notice of Vindonius's work in his Bibliotheca (codex 163).
- A Syriac translation was made in the 6th or 7th century, and Arabic and Armenian translations were made from this in the 9th and 10th centuries.
- One page of the original work survives in Bibliothèque Nationale MS B.N.Gr. 2313 f. 49v.

== Bibliography ==
- H. Beckh, "De Geoponicorum codicibus manuscriptis" in Acta seminarii philologici Erlangensis vol. 4 (1886) pp. 268–70.
- E. Fehrle, Richtlinien zur Textgestaltung der griechischen Geoponica. Heidelberg 1920.
- John A. C. Greppin, "The Armenians and the Greek Geoponica" in Byzantion vol. 57 (1987) pp. 46–55.
- J. F. Habbi, "Testi geoponici classici in siriaco e in arabo" in Autori classici in lingue del vicino e medio oriente ed. G. Fiaccadori (Rome, 1990) pp. 77–92.
- A. Paul de Lagarde, Geoponicon in sermonem syriacum versorum quae supersunt. Leipzig: Teubner, 1860.
- E. Oder, "Beiträge zur Geschichte der Landwirthschaft bei den Griechen" in Rheinisches Museum vol. 45 (1890) pp. 58–98, 202-22, vol. 48 (1893) pp. 1–40.
- R. H. Rodgers, "Hail, Frost, and Pests in the Vineyard: Anatolius of Berytus as a Source for the Nabataean Agriculture" in Journal of the American Oriental Societies vol. 100 (1980) pp. 1–11.
- J. L. Teall, "The Byzantine agricultural tradition" in Dumbarton Oaks papers vol. 25 (1971) pp. 35–59.
- Max Wellmann: "Anatolius 14" (in German). In: Realencyclopädie der classischen Altertumswissenschaft (RE). Vol. I,2, Stuttgart, 1894, col. 2073.
