= Cassius Dionysius =

Ancient berber agricultural writer

Cassius Dionysius of Utica (Ancient Greek: Διονύσιος ὁ Ἰτυκαῖος) was an ancient North African writer who translated the agricultural book of Magon from Punic into Greek in the first century BC. The Roman nomen, Cassius, combined with the Greek cognomen, Dionysius, make it likely that he was a slave (perhaps a prisoner of war), originally Greek-speaking, who was owned and afterwards freed by a Roman of the gens Cassia. Cassius Dionysius compiled a farming manual in Greek, now lost. Its title was Georgika ("Agriculture"); it was divided into twenty books, and was dedicated by its author to the Roman praetor Sextilius in 89 or 88 BC.

According to Columella, who referred to the work in his own surviving De Agricultura ("On Farming"), an amount equivalent to eight books of Cassius Dionysius' work, two-fifths of the whole, was translated from a preceding work in Punic by Mago. After Rome's destruction of Carthage in 146 BC, the Carthaginian libraries were given to the kings of Numidia, but Mago's work was considered too important to lose. It was brought to Rome and Decimus Junius Silanus was commissioned by the Roman Senate to translate it into Latin. Whether Cassius Dionysius worked independently, or on the basis of Silanus's work, is not known; however, his residence in Utica, in formerly Carthaginian North Africa, leads to the suggestion that he knew Punic as well as Greek and Latin.

Cassius Dionysius's compilation is occasionally cited by later authors, but its length rendered it unpopular. It was soon afterwards abridged by Diophanes of Nicaea, whose version was divided into six books.

The following is a partial list of fragments of Cassius Dionysius' work:

- Greek names of the winds and their importance to the farmer.
- How to select labourers for hire.
- Types of manure.
- Mules sometimes foal in Africa. Mules and mares foal in the twelfth month after conception.
- Notes on farmyard animals.
- Two names for leeks.
