= Decimus Junius Silanus (translator of Mago) =

Decimus Junius Silanus was an ancient Roman of the 2nd century BC. He was of noble family and was an expert in Punic language and literature.

After Rome's destruction of Carthage in 146 BC, the Carthaginian libraries were given to the kings of Numidia, but one work was considered too important to lose. This was the agricultural manual in Punic by the Carthaginian author Mago. This long work (it was divided into 28 books) was brought to Rome, and Silanus was commissioned by the Roman Senate to translate it. At about the same period an adaptation into Greek was made by Cassius Dionysius.

As translated by Silanus, the work opened with general advice which is thus summarized by Columella:

One who has bought land should sell his town house so that he will have no desire to worship the household gods of the city rather than those of the country; the man who takes greater delight in his city residence will have no need of a country estate.

Columella, De Agricultura 1.1.18.

Silanus's translation is lost, as is Mago's original, but through the translation Mago's work influenced the tradition of Roman agriculture. It is sometimes quoted by surviving Roman writers on farming. The following is a partial list of fragments:

- If buying a farm, sell your town house (see quotation above).
- The most productive vineyards face north.
- How to plant vines.
- How to prune vines.
- How to plant olives.
- How to plant fruit trees.
- How to harvest marsh plants.
- Preparing various grains and pulses for grinding.
- How to select bullocks.
- Notes on the health of cattle.
- Mules sometimes foal in Africa. Mules and mares foal in the twelfth month after conception.
- Notes on farmyard animals.
- Getting bees from the carcass of a bullock or ox.
- The beekeeper should not kill drones.
- How to preserve pomegranates.
- How to make the best passum (raisin wine).

== See also ==
- Junia (gens)
