= Hercules and the Hydra (Zurbarán) =

Painting by Francisco de Zurbarán

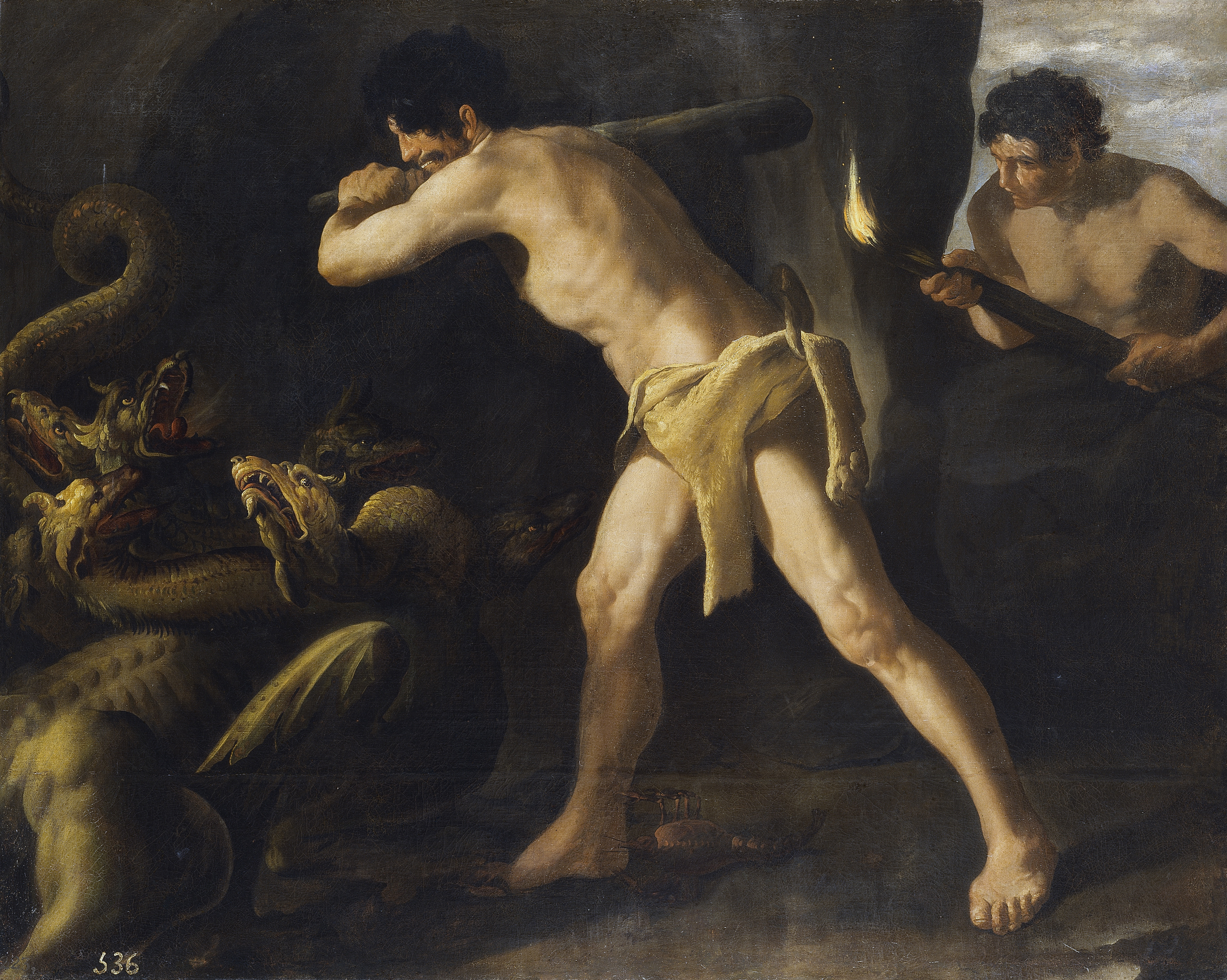
Hercules and the Hydra (1634) by Francisco de Zurbarán

Hercules and the Hydra is a 1634 painting by Francisco de Zurbarán of Hercules fighting the Lernaean Hydra, now in the Prado Museum in Madrid. It was from a series of the Labours of Hercules for the Hall of Realms in Madrid's Palacio del Buen Retiro.
