= Julius Atticus =

Roman agricultural author

Julius Atticus was a Roman author who wrote an agricultural book on vines, likely in the early first century. He is referenced by the author Columella in his book De re rustica, although Columella criticized some of his advice. The agricultural author Julius Graecinus was his student.
