= De Medicina =

Medical treatise by Aulus Cornelius Celsus

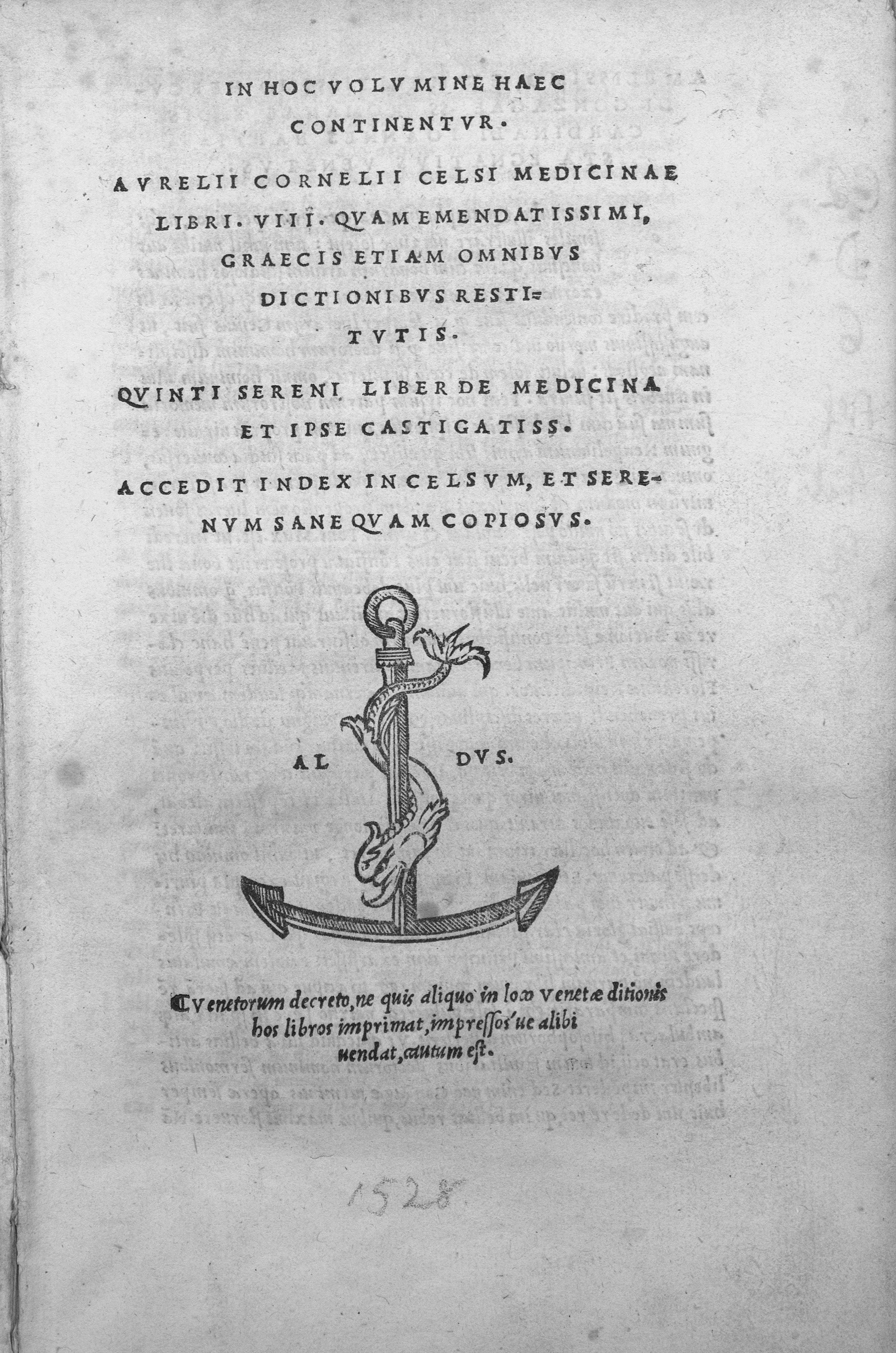
De medicina, 1528 edition published by Aldo Manuzio

De Medicina is a 1st-century medical treatise by Aulus Cornelius Celsus, a Roman encyclopedist and possibly (but not likely) a practicing physician. It is the only surviving section of a much larger encyclopedia; only small parts still survive from sections on agriculture, military science, oratory, jurisprudence and philosophy. De Medicina draws upon knowledge from ancient Greek works, and is considered the best surviving treatise on Alexandrian medicine. It is also the first complete textbook on medicine to be printed, and has an "encyclopedic arrangement that follows the tripartite division of medicine at the time as established by Hippocrates and Asclepiades – diet, pharmacology, and surgery." This work also covers the topics of disease and therapy. Sections detail the removal of missile weapons, stopping bleeding, preventing inflammation, diagnosis of internal maladies, removal of kidney stones, the amputation of limbs and so forth.

The original work was published some time before 47 CE. It consisted of eight books in highly regarded Latin text. The subject matter is divided as follows:

- Book I – Diet, hygiene, and the benefits of exercise.
- Book II – The cause of disease, its symptoms and prognosis.
- Book III – Treatment of diseases, including the common cold and pneumonia.

He classified mental disorders into: Phrenitis, delirium with fever; Melancholia, depression; one due to false images and disordered judgment, presumably schizophrenia; Delirium due to fear; Lethargus, coma; and Morbus comitialis, epilepsy. The term insania, insanity, was first used by him. The methods of treatment included bleeding, frightening the patient, emetics, enemas, total darkness, and decoctions of poppy or henbane, and pleasant ones such as music therapy, travel, sport, reading aloud, and massage. He was aware of the importance of the doctor-patient relationship.

- Book IV – Anatomical descriptions of selected diseases.
- Book V – Medicines, including opiates, diuretics, purgatives and laxatives.
- Book VI – Ulcers, skin lesions and diseases.
- Book VII – Classical operations, such as lithotomy and removal of cataracts.
- Book VIII – Treatment of dislocations and fractures.

De Medicina was known during the Middle Ages up to the 9th or 10th centuries, but was later lost up until the 15th century. It was the first medical book to be printed, in Florence, 1478.
