= Aulus Cornelius Celsus =

Roman physician and encyclopaedist (c. 25 BC - c. 50 AD)

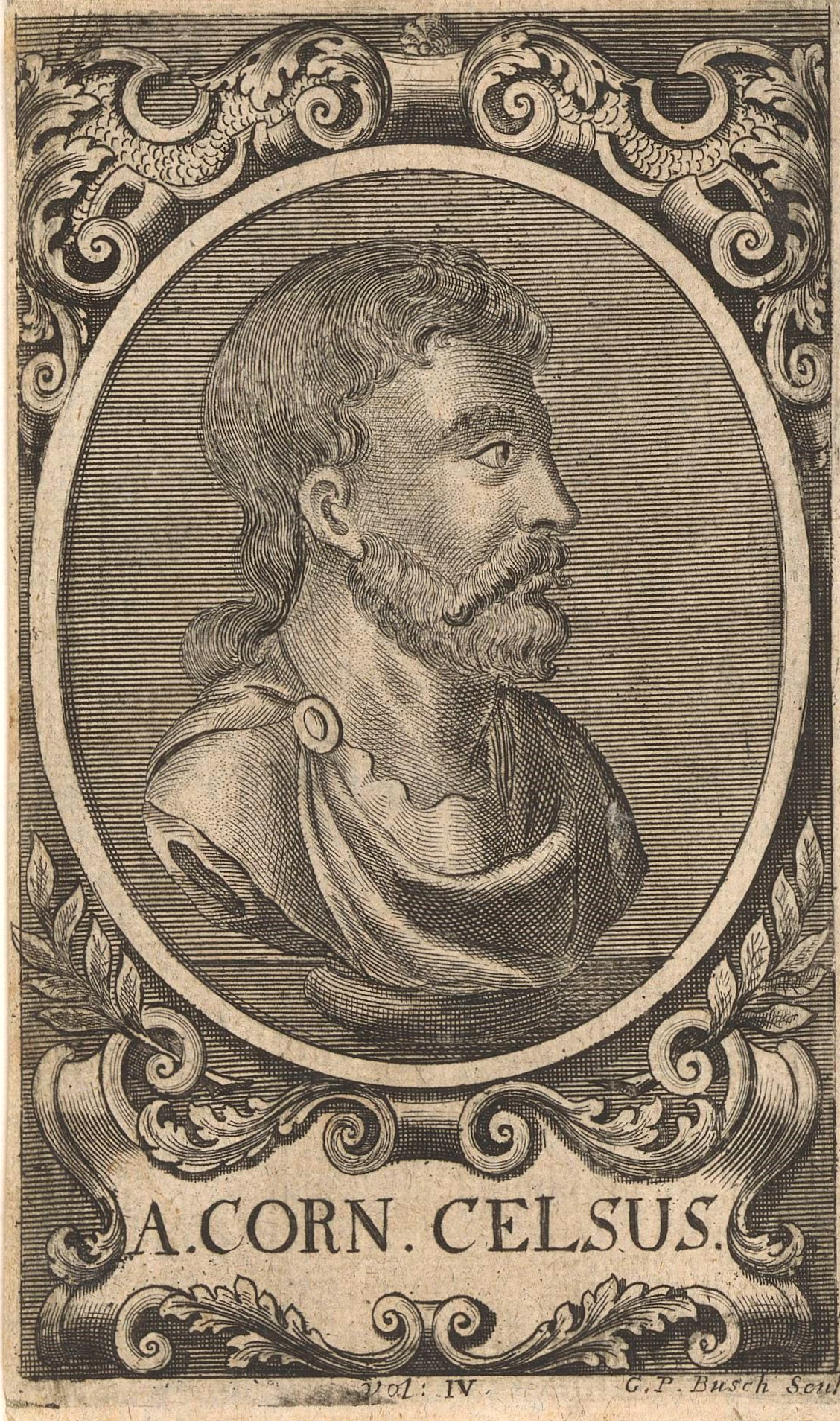
- Born: c. 25 BC
- Died: c. 50 AD (aged roughly 75)
- Occupation: Encyclopaedist

Aulus Cornelius Celsus (c. 25 BC – c. 50 AD) was a Roman encyclopedist, known for his extant medical work, De Medicina (On Medicine), which is believed to be the only surviving section of a much larger encyclopedia. The De Medicina is a primary source on diet, pharmacy, surgery and related fields, and it is one of the best sources concerning medical knowledge in the Roman world. The lost portions of his encyclopedia likely included volumes on agriculture, law, rhetoric, and military arts. He made contributions to the classification of human skin disorders in dermatology, such as myrmecia, and his name is often found in medical terminology regarding the skin, e.g., kerion celsi and area celsi. His name is said to be referenced in the name Paracelsus.

== Life ==
Nothing is known about the life of Celsus. Even his praenomen is uncertain; he has been called both Aurelius and Aulus, with the latter being more plausible. Some incidental expressions in his De Medicina suggest that he lived under the reigns of Augustus and Tiberius; which is confirmed by his reference to the Greek physician Themison as being recently in his old age.

It is not known with any certainty where he lived. He has been identified as the possible dedicator of a gravestone in Rome, but it has also been supposed that he lived in Narbonese Gaul, because he refers to a species of vine (marcum) which, according to Pliny, was native to that region.

It is doubtful whether he practised medicine himself, and although Celsus seems to describe and recommend his own medical observations sanctioned by experience, Quintilian says that his volumes included all sorts of literary matters, and even agriculture and military tactics.

== Works ==
=== De Medicina ===
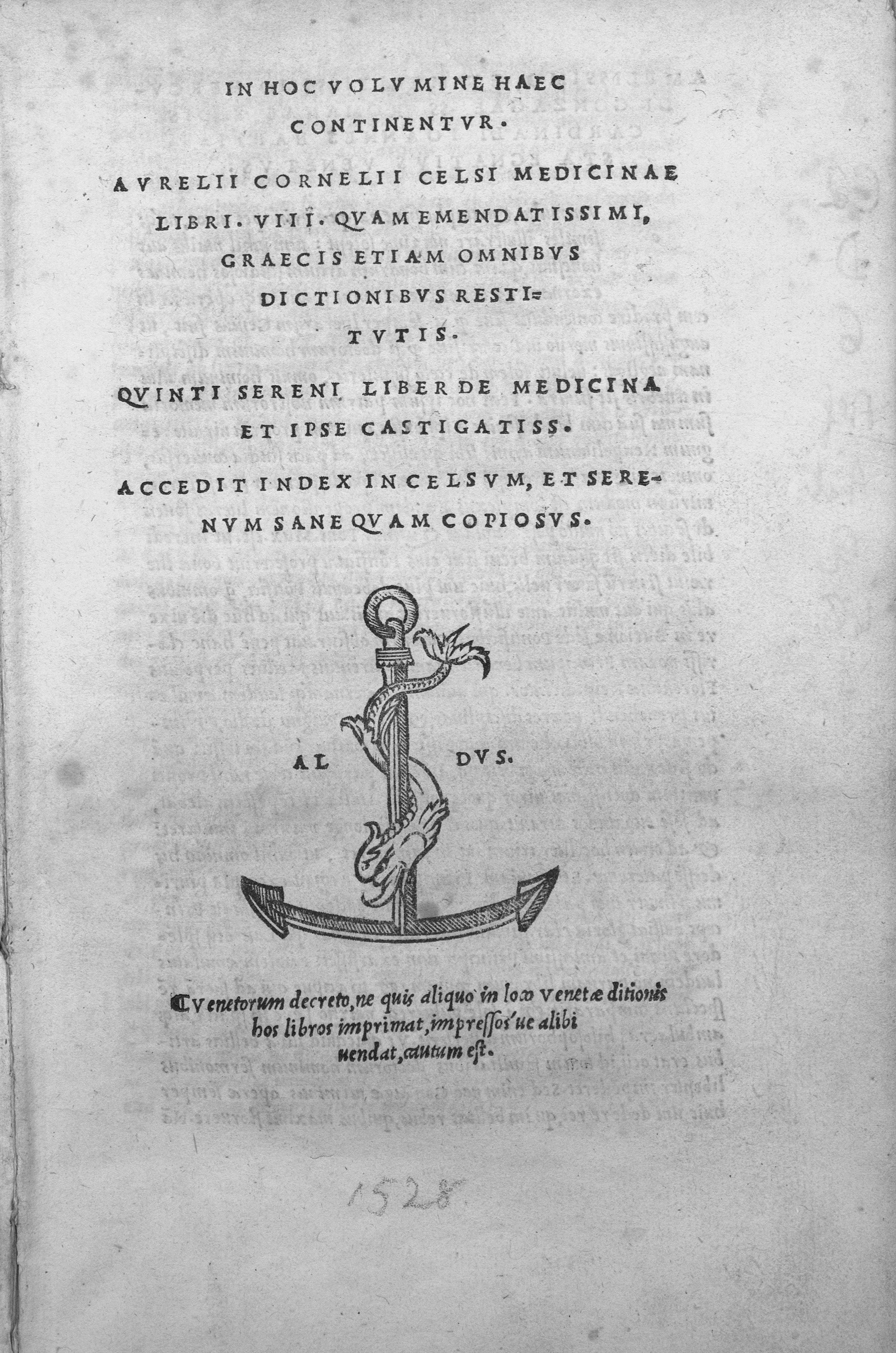
An early printed edition of De medicina (16th century, Aldine Press)

Of the numerous volumes of his encyclopedia published before 47 CE, only one remains intact, his celebrated treatise On Medicine (De Medicina). "The work's encyclopedic arrangement follows the tripartite division of medicine at the time as established by Hippocrates and Asclepiades — diet, pharmacology, and surgery." It is divided into eight books.

- Book 1 – The History of Medicine (includes references to eighty medical authors, some of whom are known only through this book)
- Book 2 – General Pathology
- Book 3 – Specific Diseases
- Book 4 – Parts of the Body
- Book 5 and 6 – Pharmacology
- Book 7 – Surgery
- Book 8 – Orthopedics

In the "Prooemium" or introduction to De Medicina there is an early discussion of the relevance of theory to medical practice and the pros and cons of both animal experimentation and human experimentation. Celsus discusses, for example, the case of Herophilos and Erasistratos, who he asserts practised vivisection.

In the treatment of disease, Celsus's principal method was to observe and watch over the operations of Nature, and to regulate rather than oppose them, conceiving that fever consisted essentially in an effort of the body to throw off some morbid cause, and that, if not unduly interfered with, the process would terminate in a state of health. On occasions, however, he boldly recommends the use of the scalpel; his rules for blood letting and purgatives are laid down with detail and precision; and many of the rules he prescribes were not very different from those still in use at the beginning of the 19th century.

His work contains detailed descriptions of the symptoms and different varieties of fever, and he is credited with recording the cardinal signs of inflammation known as "Celsus tetrad of inflammation": calor (warmth), dolor (pain), tumor (swelling) and rubor (redness and hyperaemia).

He goes into great detail regarding the preparation of numerous ancient medicinal remedies including the preparation of opioids. In addition, he describes many 1st century Roman surgical procedures which included removal of a cataract, treatment for bladder stones, and the setting of fractures.

Celsus wrote on the anatomy of the eye and was the first to call one of its layers the choroid. During the twentieth century, many historians claimed that Celsus believed that the crystalline lens is in the exact center of the eye. In fact, Celsus made no specific statement about the position of the crystalline lens, and his Graeco-Roman contemporaries did understand that the lens is located to the front.

Hippocrates used the Greek word καρκίνος, karkínos 'crab, crayfish' to refer to malignant tumors as carcinomas. It was Celsus who translated the Greek term into the Latin cancer, also meaning 'crab'.

The first printed edition of Celsus' work was published in 1478. His style has been much admired as being equal in purity and elegance to that of the best writers of the Augustan age.

=== Some online editions ===
- In hoc volvmine haec continentvr Avrelii Cornelii Celsi medicinae libri VIII : qvam emendatissimi, Graecis etiam omnibvs dictionibvs restitvtis. Beigefügte Werke: Qvinti Sereni Liber de medicina et ipse castigatiss. Accedit index in Celsvm et Serenvm sane qvam copiosvs ..., ed. Ioannes Baptista Egnatius. Venetiis : in aedibvs Aldi et Andreae Asvlani soceri, 1528. Digital edition of the University and State Library Düsseldorf.
- Aurelii Cornelij Celsi de arte Medica libri octo : multis in Locis iam emendatiores longè, quàm unquam antea, editi . Beigefügte Werke: Accessit quoque Rerum & Verborum in hisce omnibus memorabilium locupletissimus Index . Basileae : Oporinus, 1552 Digital edition of the University and State Library Düsseldorf.
- Aur. Corn. Celsi De medicina : libri octo; cum notis integris Joannis Caesarii, Roberti Constantini, Josehi Scaligeri, Isaaci Casauboni, Joannis Baptistae Morgagni, Ac locis parallelis. Lugduni Batavorum : Joh. Arn. Langerak, 1746. Digital edition of the University and State Library Düsseldorf.

=== On agriculture ===
Celsus also wrote a technical work on agriculture, on which Columella partly based his De Re Rustica.
