= Geoponica =

20-volume collection of agricultural lore compiled in 10th century Constantinople

The Geoponica or Geoponika (Greek: Γεωπονικά) is a twenty-book collection of agricultural lore, compiled during the 10th century in Constantinople for the Byzantine emperor Constantine VII Porphyrogenitus. The Greek word Geoponica signifies "agricultural pursuits" in its widest sense. It is the only surviving Byzantine agricultural work.

During the Macedonian Renaissance, the emperor Constantine VII assembled several compendia - compilations and excerpts of ancient writings - of which Geoponika was one. Around 50 manuscripts, dating from between the 10th and 16th centuries, have survived. Geoponika incorporated the work of Cassianus Bassus, which was compiled from an earlier work by Vindonius Anatolius.

== Sources ==
The 10th century collection is sometimes (wrongly) ascribed to the 7th century author Cassianus Bassus, whose collection, also titled Geoponica, was integrated into the extant work. Bassus drew heavily on the work of another agricultural compiler, Vindonius Anatolius (4th century). The ultimate sources of the Geoponica include Pliny, various lost Hellenistic and Roman-period Greek agriculture and veterinary authors, the Carthaginian agronomist Mago, and even works passing under the name of the Persian prophet Zoroaster. (The names of the principal sources for each section are attached to the text, although the age and correctness of these attributions remains in doubt.) The Greek manuscript tradition is extremely complex and not fully understood. Syriac, Pahlavi, Arabic and Armenian translations attest to its worldwide popularity and complicate the manuscript tradition still further.

== Contents ==
The Geoponica embraces all manner of "agricultural" information, including celestial and terrestrial omina, viticulture, oleoculture, apiculture, veterinary medicine, the construction of fish ponds and much more.

Taken from Charles Anthon's Manual of Greek Literature (1853).

1. Of the atmosphere, and of the rising and setting of the stars
2. Of general matters appertaining to agriculture, and of the different kinds of corn
3. Of the various agricultural duties suitable to each month
4–5. Of the cultivation of the vine
6–8. Of the making of wine
9. Of the cultivation of the olive and the making of oil
10–12. Of horticulture
13. Of the animals and insects injurious to plants
14. Of pigeons and other birds
15. Of natural sympathies and antipathies, and of the management of bees
16. Of horses, donkeys and camels
17. Of the breeding of cattle
18. Of the breeding of sheep
19. Of dogs, hares, deer, pigs, and of salting meat
20. Of fishes

== See also ==
- Columella
- Andalusi agricultural corpus
- Agronomics

== Bibliography ==
- Geoponika: Farm Work. Translated by Dalby, Andrew. Totnes: Prospect Books. 2011. ISBN 978-1-903018-69-9.
- Beckh, Henricus, ed. (1895). Geoponica sive Cassiani Bassi scholastici de re rustica eclogae (in Ancient Greek) (reprint 1994 ed.). Leipzig: Teubner. ISBN 3-598-71387-8.
