= Cassianus Bassus =

Cassianus Bassus (Greek: Κασσιανός Βάσσος), called Scholasticus (lawyer), was one of the geoponici, a group of Greek and Latin writers on agricultural subjects. He lived at the end of the 6th or the beginning of the 7th century.

Bassus compiled from earlier writers a collection of agricultural literature; the principal source was Vindonius Anatolius. Dedicated to his son, also called Bassus, his work was entitled Eklogai peri georgias ("Selections on farming"); the usual Latin version of this title is Eclogae de re rustica.

The original Greek text of Cassianus Bassus has been lost, but some of the contents have survived as part of a collection entitled Geoponica, completed about the year 950 and dedicated to the emperor Constantine VII Porphyrogenitus. It contains a full list of the authorities drawn upon, and the subjects treated include agriculture, birds, bees, horses, cattle, sheep, dogs, fishes and the like. In addition, a 7th-century Middle Persian translation and two different Arabic language translations of respectively the 8th and 9th century have also survived.

According to a Byzantine tradition attributed to Cassianus Bassus, pig dung fertilizer should only be used for almond trees. Similar views were expressed by Columella, long pre-dating Islamic taboos related to the animal, though Ibn Bassal and some later writers from Yemen also recorded negative effects of pig dung "burning" (haraqa) plants.
