= Mago (agricultural writer) =

Carthaginian writer

Mago (Punic: 𐤌𐤂𐤍, MGN) was a Carthaginian writer, author of an agricultural manual in Punic which was a record of the farming knowledge of Carthage. The Punic text has been lost, but some fragments of Greek and Latin translations survive.

== Work ==
Mago's long work was divided into 28 books. It incorporated local Berber and Punic traditional practices. Carthage being the granary of the central Mediterranean, knowledge of agricultural and veterinary practices was extensive. It began with general advice which is thus summarized by Columella:

One who has bought land should sell his town house so that he will have no desire to worship the household gods of the city rather than those of the country; the man who takes greater delight in his city residence will have no need of a country estate.

Columella, De Re Rustica 1.1.18.

After Rome's destruction of Carthage in 146 BC, the Carthaginian libraries were given to the kings of Numidia. Uniquely, Mago's book was retrieved and brought to Rome. It was adapted into Greek by Cassius Dionysius and translated in full into Latin by D. Junius Silanus, the latter at the expense of the Roman Senate. The Greek translation was later abridged by Diophanes of Nicaea, whose version was divided into six books.

Extracts from these translations survive in quotations by Roman writers on agriculture, including Varro, Columella, Pliny the Elder, and Gargilius Martialis. This is a partial list of surviving fragments:

- If buying a farm, sell your town house.
- The most productive vineyards face north.
- How to plant vines.
- How to prune vines.
- How to plant olives.
- How to plant fruit trees.
- How to harvest marsh plants.
- Preparing various grains and pulses for grinding.
- How to select bullocks.
- Notes on the health of cattle.
- Mules sometimes foal in Africa. Mules and mares foal in the twelfth month after conception.
- Notes on farmyard animals.
- Getting bees from the carcass of a bullock or ox.
- The beekeeper should not kill drones.
- How to preserve pomegranates.
- How to make the best passum (raisin wine).

== See also ==
- Phoenicians and wine
