= Mesta =

Association of sheep ranchers

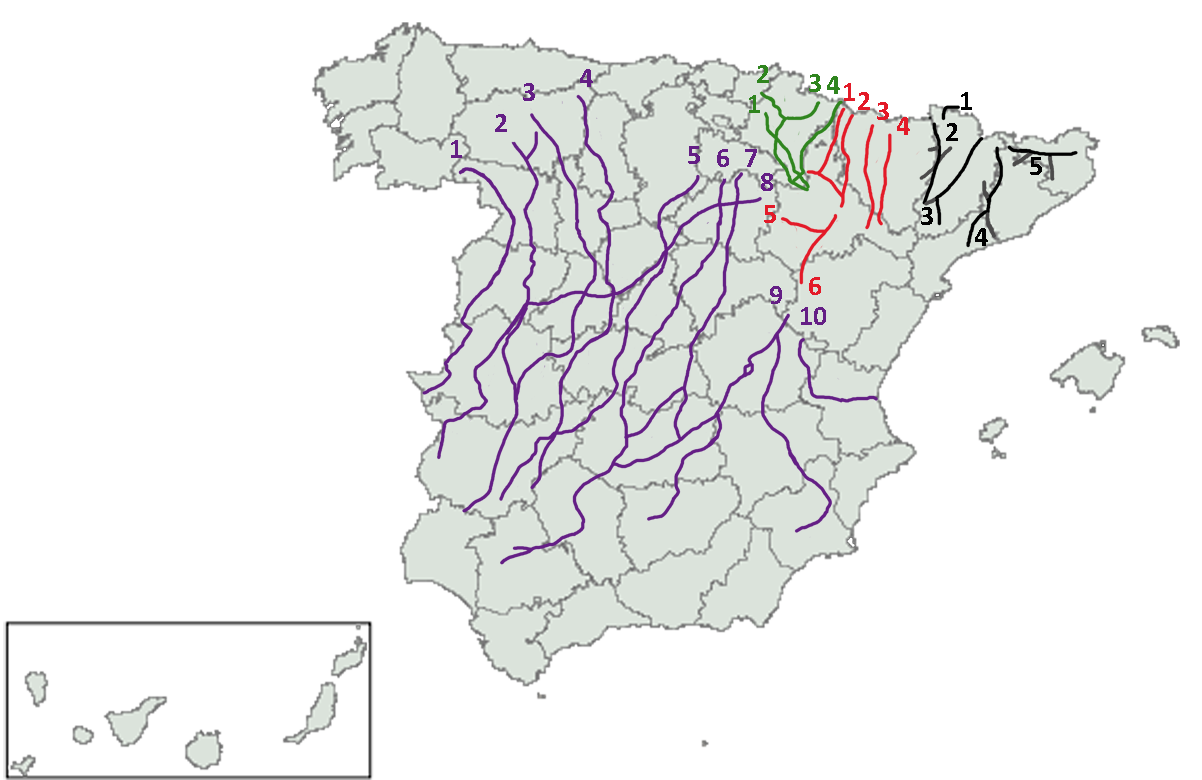
The principal drove roads of Spain

The Mesta (Spanish: Honrado Concejo de la Mesta, lit. 'Honorable Council of the Mesta') was a powerful association protecting livestock owners and their animals in the Crown of Castile that was incorporated in the 13th century and was dissolved in 1836. Although best known for its organisation of the annual migration of transhumant sheep, particularly those of the Merino breed, the flocks and herds of all species of livestock in Castile and their owners were under the oversight of the Mesta, including both the transhumant and the sedentary ones. The transhumant sheep were generally owned in Old Castile and León, where they had their summer pastures, and they migrated to and from winter pastures of Extremadura and Andalusia according to the season.

The royal protection for the Mesta's flocks and herds was signified by the term Cabaña Real (Spanish: Cabaña Real de Ganados, lit. 'royal flock or herd of livestock' that applied to these protected animals. The kings of Castile conceded many other privileges to the Mesta. The cañadas (traditional rights-of-way for sheep or sheep-walks) were legally protected in perpetuity from being built on, cultivated or blocked, and they still are protected public domain in our days. The most important cañadas were called cañadas reales, 'royal cañadas', because they were established by royal decrees.

The origin of the Mesta is related to the growth of transhumance after the Castilian conquest of the Taifa of Toledo. Three groups were granted royal charters including the rights to winter pasturage in the Tagus valley. The first were monasteries that owned summer pastures in the Sierra de Guadarrama, followed by the religious military orders which had acquired lands after the conquest of Toledo, in the area renamed New Castile. Later, the urban elites of Old Castile and León, who used urban grazing in the city's término (Spanish: término, lit. 'rural area within a city's jurisdiction', including its pasturage on nearby sierras, were granted similar rights. None of these groups, nor the few lay members of the nobility that also received such grants, could base their wealth on crop-growing in the dry and underpopulated lands of New Castile, so relied on raising livestock.

Initially, the Mesta included both large and small livestock owners and was controlled by them, however, from the time of Charles V, the organisation ceased to be controlled exclusively by such owners, as royal officials, who were leading nobles and ecclesiastics and not necessarily stock-owners, were appointed to its governing body. Although wool exports began in the 14th century, it was only when the export of high-quality merino wool was stimulated in the late 15th century by a sales tax exemption for Mesta members that this trade significantly enriched the members of the Mesta. These were increasingly members of the higher nobility, who owned flocks in excess of 20,000 merino sheep, and smaller owners ceased to be involved in transhumance. The most important wool markets were held in Burgos, Medina del Campo and Segovia, but particularly Burgos.

Some Madrid streets are still part of the cañada system, and there are groups of people who occasionally drive sheep across the modern city as a reminder of their ancient rights and cultures, although these days sheep are generally transported by rail.

== Foundation ==
Although the earliest surviving charter granting royal protection and grazing and other privileges to the Mesta was issued by Alfonso X of Castile in 1273, it claimed to replace four separate older documents, and it did not so much create the Mesta as assume its existence when granting it royal protection from the local taxes and restrictions it was encountering. The charters and privileges of the Mesta resemble those of mediaeval merchant guild, but it was actually a protective association, facilitating the business of the sheep and other livestock owners without engaging directly in their business. It did not own any sheep or pastures, buy and sell wool or control markets, and its close association with the Spanish government gave it a status and extensive presence unmatched by any guild.

Sheep numbers in Castile and León had increased greatly in the 12th and early 13th centuries, outgrowing the available local grazing and encouraging transhumance to more distant pastures. This transhumance was a frequent cause of dispute between the shepherds and local inhabitants, and the Cortes of 1252 enacted laws regulating the number and amounts of tolls that could be levied upon the flocks moving through a district. It also allowed them to use streams and customary sheepwalks (cañadas) and prevented the enclosure of previously open pasturage, foreshadowing the privileges granted to the Mesta. During the Cortes of Burgos in 1269, the king imposed the servicio de los ganados, a tax on migratory flocks and herds, and the recognition of the Mesta in 1273 allowed Alfonso to derive a greater portion of the resources of the sheep-herding industry more efficiently.

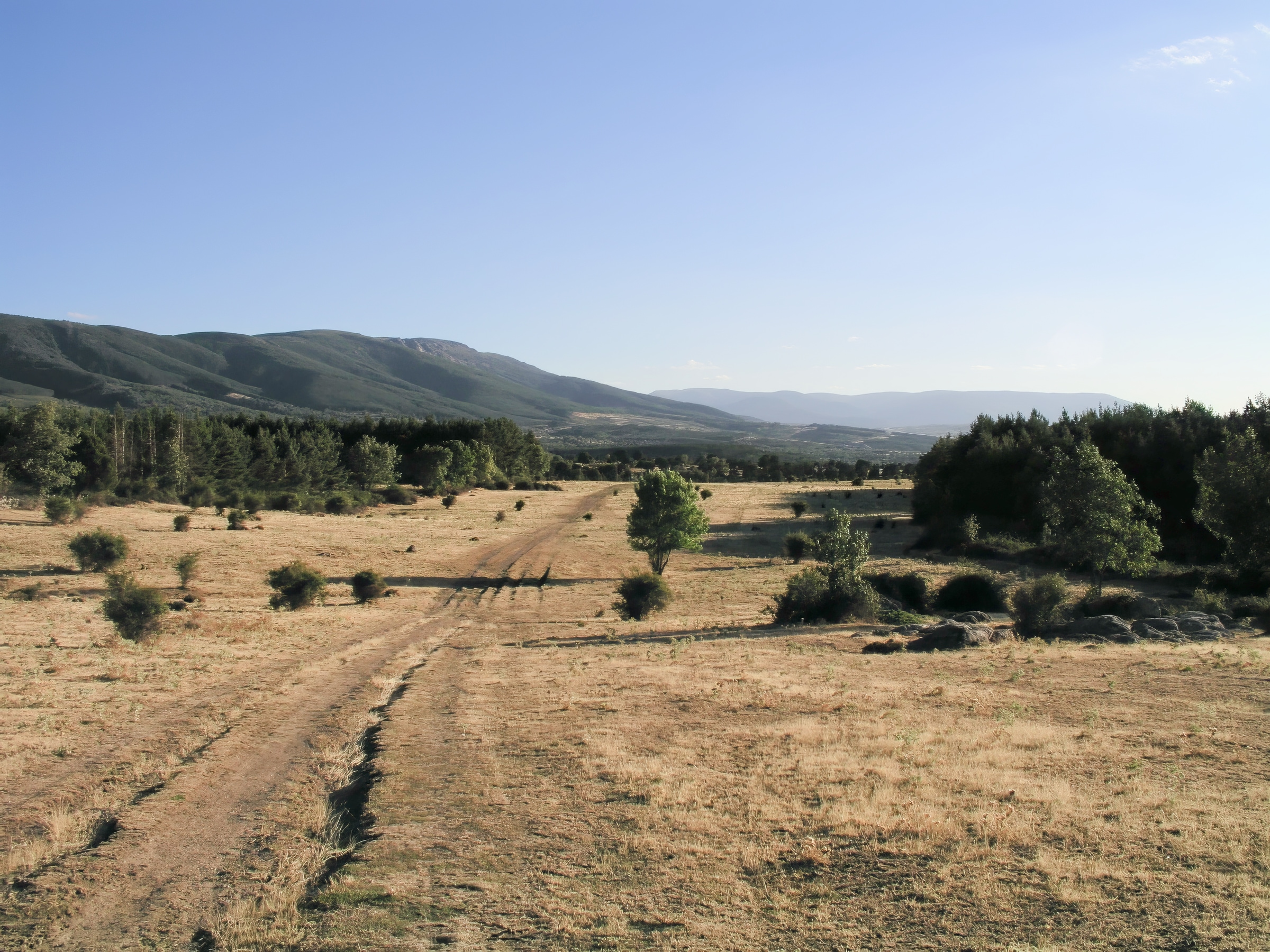
Royal cañada trail through Old Castile (Segovia, Spain)

Klein noted three possible origins for the word mesta. Firstly, it might be related to annual assemblies to dispose of strays that were called mezclados, as they were mixed with a strange flock or herd, the name ultimately deriving from the Latin Latin: mixta, lit. 'mixed', the explanation he preferred. An alternative, also based on the Latin mixta is that it refers to the common ownership of the Mesta's animals by multiple parties. However, the animals were individually owned, not common property, and generally different owners' flocks were kept separate.

Secondly, it might be related to the amistad or amity, which Klein regarded as unconvincing.

Finally, Klein mentions the name mechta, used by Algerian nomads for their winter sheep encampments, as a possibility. There were very few references to Castilian mestas in the second half of the 13th and early 14th centuries, and these may apply to the guardian escorts of the transhumant sheep rather than any assembly of sheep owners. The Arabic meshta for a winter gathering of sheep may have been transferred to the meetings of animal owners held at that time, and later, to local sheep-owners' associations in Andalucía and to the national body, both composed of such owners.

The word mestengo, (now spelled 'mesteño') referred to animals of uncertain ownership, literally "belonging to the mesta", deriving from the name of that body. In New Spain in colonial North America, feral horses came to be known as mesteños, from which is derived the English word mustang, used for the free-roaming horses of the modern Western United States.

== Transhumance before the Mesta ==
=== Environmental context ===
The north coast, northwest and, to a lesser extent, the southwest of Spain enjoy abundant rainfall, but the central Meseta has low rainfall, and many areas could hardly support dry arable farming in mediaeval times. Dependence solely on cereal cultivation risked periodic starvation, and livestock rearing was important in the mediaeval agricultural economy of Spain's Christian kingdoms. Old Castile was the main cereal growing area, and it supplied its own grain needs in most years, but other parts of the Kingdom of Castile relied on Old Castile in years of shortage. The archaeological record shows that keeping pigs, sheep and goats was widespread, but numbers were limited by the lack of food in the dry summers and cold winters, and cattle were only kept in better watered areas. Small flocks of sheep and goats could be moved to summer hill pastures near settlements, but large numbers of all animals were slaughtered in late autumn. There is no clear evidence for large scale sheep transhumance of sheep flocks before the late mediaeval period.

In the early mediaeval period, as the Christian Kingdom of Castile and León expanded from their original northern territories, relatively well-watered and with good soils, to the interior plains of the Meseta Central, where scarce rainfall and poor soils made cereal agriculture difficult. In the Muslim-controlled areas, water management, irrigation, and the introduction of drought resistant and more productive crop varieties overcame the water shortages, but these techniques were not adopted in the Christian territories until they had conquered areas where they were used.

=== Before 1085 ===
It has been claimed that, during the medieval Reconquest, the frontier lands between Christian and Muslim areas were sparsely populated, largely uncultivated and used mainly for animal grazing, and that the periodic movement of this frontier zone encouraged transhumance. However, the Christian advance into the Duero valley was undertaken by peasant mixed-farmers, who densely settled it, combining cereal crops with small livestock holdings. Only when the Reconquest progressed beyond Old Castile and entered areas of poor soils where it was difficult to grow cereals or to maintain high livestock densities did the poor quality of the land and the limited availability of grazing favour sheep transhumance over sedentary mixed farming. Transhumance existed in other Mediterranean countries with climates and grazing that favoured transhumance which were similar to central Spain, but which were not unsettled as Spain was during the Reconquest.

In the Christian lands north of the Sierra de Guadarrama, the usual livestock until the end of eleventh century were plough oxen, milk cows and pigs as well as sheep There is no evidence for large flocks of sheep before the early 1100s, and no clear evidence for any large scale transhumance of sheep flocks before the late Mediaeval period. The long-distance transhumance described from southern France, Italy and Spain was connected with the commercial exploitation of sheep, mainly for wool, and its taxation by the local states, and was not connected with subsistence farming.

Sheep were relatively unimportant in the Islamic Caliphate of Córdoba and there is no known record of long-distance transhumance before its fall in the 1030s. The Marinids, a Zenata Berber group which held extensive sheep flocks in Morocco, intervened in Andalusia several times in the late 13th and early 14th centuries in support of the Emirate of Granada, and they may have brought new breeds of sheep and the practice of long-distance transhumance, including the use of Berber and Arabic terms, into Spain. However, there is no definite evidence that the Marinids did bring their flocks to Spain and they arrived as a fighting force, conducting frequent raids against the Castilians, and were hardly in a position to protect any flocks they might have brought. It is more probable that Moroccan rams were imported, to crossbreed with the native stock.

=== After 1085 ===
The captures by Castile of Toledo in 1085 and of Zaragoza by the Kingdom of Aragon in 1118 greatly increased the sizes of these Christian kingdoms and, particularly for Aragon, their populations. However, the increase in Castile's population was not commensurate with its increased size. Much of the Muslim population of the southern territories, renamed New Castile, left for North Africa or the Emirate of Granada, and the increasing use of the heavy plough in the north of the kingdom raised cereal production and discouraged its population from southward migration into areas less suitable for mixed farming.

In the 12th and 13th centuries, many sheep-herders in Old Castile and León began transhumance to more distant pastures, within or without those provinces, This was both of the normal variety, moving from the home farm to summer pastures within the same province, and an inverse movement to winter pastures further away. Two examples of normal transhumance are first, when many Castilian cities and towns were granted royal charters in the 12th century, they gained control over large areas of upland pasturage and granted grazing rights to their citizens. and, second, after the Aragónese conquest of the Ebro valley in the first quarter of the 12th century, sheep wintering in the valley were granted rights by the king to summer pasture in the foothills of the Pyrenees.

=== The monasteries and military orders ===
Until the 10th century, much of the land in Old Castile and León was in the collective ownership of peasants carrying on mixed subsistence farming including small-scale, local livestock activity. However, by the 14th and 15th centuries, most of such communities had become dependent, first on monasteries, later on lay lords and finally on neighbouring cities and large towns whose councils were controlled by oligarchies. The early part of this process social and economic differentiation in the 11th to 13th centuries coincided with, and probably promoted, the rise of large-scale transhumance. In the 10th and 11th centuries, several large Benedictine monasteries founded in the Duero valley began medium-range transhumance and gained royal privileges of pasturage on the slopes of the Sierra de Guadarrama.

The Castilian expansion of the 12th century was based substantially on the civic militias of Old Castile, but in the 13th century the forces of the military orders based in the south of New Castile were more important. The orders, particularly those of Santiago and Calatrava were granted extensive rights to land in this territory. The military orders settled few peasant cultivators in their lands, although peasants grew some grain close to the towns, and many Muslim inhabitants left.

At the start of the 12th century, the raising of livestock, preferably sheep, centred around pasture rights granted to clerics, initially those around the slopes of the Sierra de Guadarrama but later they began "inverse transhumance" to the pastures of the Sierra Morena. It was the flocks of the monasteries that first opened up the cañadas in New Castile, but these were soon followed by the military orders, and later by secular flocks, among the first being those from Burgos in the last decades of the 12th century. By the late 12th century, the military Orders were regularly driving flocks of sheep from New Castile into the previously Muslim areas of La Mancha and western Murcia, and even into areas still under Muslim control before the Battle of Las Navas de Tolosa.

=== The towns ===
The kings of Castile from Alfonso VIII to Ferdinand III protected the rights of the monasteries and military orders to move their sheep to graze in the south of their kingdom, but Alfonso X realised that granting similar transhumant rights to the cities and towns of Old Castile and León would create a significant new source of income. The conquest of the Guadalquivir valley in the 13th century permitted flocks from the Duero and Tagus basins to over-winter there, extending the length of transhumance journeys and the number of sheep that could be fed through the winter.

== Operation of the Mesta ==
=== Organisation ===
The Mesta's original charter of 1273 was supplemented in 1276 and renewed in 1347 and 1371. Its internal organisation was originally governed by regulations of 1379, which have been lost. However, ordinances of 1492, supplemented by a code of 1511, regulated its operations for most of its existence. It was organised into four geographical units (Spanish: quadrillas, lit. 'groups or gangs') (cuadrillas in modern Spanish) based around the principal pastoral cities of the northern meseta, Soria, Segovia, Cuenca and León, where most of the flocks of Merino sheep had their home pastures. Its governing council consisted a president who was, after 1500, always chosen from the members of the Royal Council, and the leaders of each of the four quadrillas. The office of president was so powerful that, when the reformer Pedro Rodríguez, Count of Campomanes was appointed to this post in 1779 to eliminate the organisation's abuses, he went far towards dismantling the Mesta's organisation by promoting agriculture in the Sierra Morena, one of its principal winter pasturelands, despite opposition from Mesta members.

The most important administrative officials of the Mesta were the alcaldes de quadrilla (also called alcaldes de mesta, two elected by each quadrilla, who were entrusted with the general administration of the laws relating to its members. There were also financial and legal officials who represented members in arranging leases and in disputes with third-parties.

The assemblies of the Mesta were open to anyone who paid its membership dues, which were based in the number of sheep each owned, and no minimum ownership was required. However, it was estimated that only around one-tenth of its membership attended these assemblies. Although every member present had a single vote, nobles and substantial owners had the greatest influence and were often able to direct proceedings. Initially, the Mesta held three assemblies a year, but from 1500 this was reduced to two, one in the southern pasturelands in January or February, and the other in one of the four northern quadrilla centres in September or October. These assemblies dealt with the organisation of the next transhumance and the election of Mesta officials, and proposals were first voted on by each quadrilla, then in a general assembly, where each quadrilla had a single vote. In the 18th century, meetings were often reduced to one a year, always held in Madrid.

Although great nobles and major monasteries are frequently recorded as Mesta member, these large owners were not typical of the industry. The limited available evidence from the 16th century suggests there were between 3,000 and 4,000 owners, that two-thirds of the sheep migrating annually were held in flocks of less than 100 sheep and that very few flocks exceeded 1,000 sheep. Although by the 18th century, there were fewer small owners and several owners held flocks of more than 20,000 sheep, the Mesta remained largely an organisation of owners of small to moderately-sized flocks, and never simply a combination of large owners. However, it is also clear that, in the Mesta's final century of existence, many of the owners of small flocks had to abandon the annual migration, unless they were employed by large owners as shepherds, because their small flocks were no longer allowed to be grouped into larger units, as had been the case in earlier centuries.

=== The annual migrations ===
There is little information on the annual migrations in the first century of the Mesta's charter, although as northern flocks were supplying the meat markets of Toledo then, this suggests that producing wool was not yet their predominant purpose. There is also nothing about how the migrations were carried out in practice in the Mesta ordinances of 1492 or its code of 1511, and only occasional documentary evidence about this from legal proceedings dating from the 16th to 18th centuries, which discuss the customary practices governing this migration. However, from the 16th century, if not earlier, the pastoral transhumant cycle, involving the dates of the two migrations, the length of daily marches and frequency of rests, and the times for lambing and shearing, was designed to ensure the best conditions for the feeding, growth and reproduction of Merino sheep. The availability of fresh grass throughout the year resulted in the increased fineness of their fleeces, and it was realised that transhumance was essential to create wool of a quality that sedentary sheep flocks could not match. This circumstance was used to justify the Mesta's privileges.

The Mesta records indicate that, from 1436 to 1549, in excess of 2.5 million sheep took part in the annual migration. This number declined during the remainder of the 16th century, and more steeply in the early 17th century to a low point of some 1.6 million sheep in 1603 to 1633, climbing slowly for the rest of the century then more rapidly from the start of the 18th century to a maximum of around 5 million transhumant sheep a year for 1790 to 1795, before a catastrophic decline following the French invasion of 1808 and the Peninsular War. In 1832, in one of the final years of the Mesta's existence, it was responsible for 1.1 million transhumant merino sheep, 2.0 million other fine wool sheep that were not transhumant and 4.9 million other sheep that were not transhumant and which produced only low-grade wool.

The most complete account of the organisation of the migrations, given by a shepherd, was recorded in 1828, in the organisation's last decade. By the 18th century, the shortage of pasture made it essential for the sheep owners to have grazing leases in advance, to avoid arbitrary price rises by landowners. They therefore relied on having a salaried Mayoral or chief shepherd with sufficient power and experience to negotiate pasture leases for all the sheep in his flock, termed his cabaña: their role in earlier years may have been less prominent than in the 1828 account. Some mayorales were guilty of fraud, agreeing to unreasonably high pasture rents with landowners and receiving a share of the excess. However, it was only by the institution of mayoralia, associations of owners which rented grazing and employed shepherds collectively, that owners could secure access to grazing lands. Despite Mesta regulations, the mayoralia competed with one another for the best grazing, and the most affluent groups monopolised this to the exclusion of poorer ones.

Most of the Merino flocks from the late 15th century on had their home pastures in León, Old Castile and north-eastern La Mancha, an area divided between the four quadrillas of León, Segovia, Soria and Cuenca, each of which dealt with a section of the annual transhumance. Flocks from León and Old Castile traveled between 550 and 750 kilometres to their winter pastures, while those from New Castile and La Mancha rarely travelled more than 250 kilometres. All these usually completed their migration south in a month or less, reaching their winter pastures in October, and they usually began their returned north in April and May.

The preparations for the journey south began in mid-September, when each owner's cabaña, which was branded with his marks, was placed in the hands of an experienced mayoral, who had to be experienced both in managing sheep and choosing good grazing. Larger cabañas were kept together on the march, but divided into smaller units termed rebaños of about 1,000 sheep managed a shepherd with several assistants and sheepdogs. The shepherds were normally engaged for a year ending in June when the flocks were returned to their home pastures, and usually paid mainly in kind, with grain, a proportion of lambs born and cheese produced, but not in wool, and with a cash fee for each 100 sheep herded. In earlier centuries, smaller flocks called hatos were grouped to form a rebaño, but this practice ceased in the 18th century as smaller owners gradually ceased to engage in transhumance or were forced out by the difficulties of securing grazing. In the early centuries of the Mesta's existence, owners of flocks were obliged to defend their stock against possible attacks by Muslim raiders or armed robbers, either in person or by making a payment, but this requirement ceased in the 16th century.

On arrival in the winter pastures, the shepherds inspected whether the pasture lands they had previously leased were adequate. Despite being granted, in theory at least, free access to southern pastures by royal charter, from the middle of the 16th century few stockholders came south without first arranging suitable pasturage, otherwise they had to pay excessive rents for any remaining low-quality grazing, often in the hills. The rebaños were divided between a number of pens built for shelter and for lambing, which took place in the winter pastures. Any old and infertile rams and diseased and weak ewes were culled soon after arrival to protect the quality of the wool, and of weak lambs were culled shortly after birth.

The lambs were ready to travel north in the following spring, and the flocks left the southern plains from mid-April. Their wool was shorn on their way north, and was then washed, and taken to one of the Mesta warehouses, the largest being in Segovia. The wool was later sent the fairs, especially Medina del Campo, or to the northern ports for shipment to Flanders and England. After the shearing, the journey north then resumed at a slower pace, and the last flocks reached their home pastures in May or early June. They would then be moved to their summer pastures in the hills, often hungry and weak after the long journey north.

=== The Cañadas ===
The annual migration was made possible by using cañadas a system of long-distance pathways used by migrating flocks which occur in those Mediterranean countries that practice transhumance. In Spain, some of the paths that run north–south are known to have existed from the early Middle Ages, although claims of Roman or pre-Roman origin are doubtful, as the ancient sheepwalks that have been described from Spain are generally relatively short and frequently run from uplands east to the Mediterranean coast, rather than from north to south. Sheep were generally only part of the mixed farming of cereals and livestock in León and Old Castile before the 12th century, less important than pigs and rarely moved outside their local area. The cañadas in León and Old Castile may have developed from an increased range of transhumance that first occurred within those provinces, and which were extended south as the northern boundaries of Muslim states retreated.

The expansion of the cañadas southward has been related to three causes, which may have all played their part, but here is no evidence of large scale transhumance in Extremadura, Andalucía and La Mancha when they were under Muslim rule, so the impetus must have come from the Christian north. From the reconquest of Toledo in 1085 to that of Andalucía, stock raising, particularly of sheep, was developed New Castile, at first by over thirty northern monasteries, bishoprics and churches, many with their summer pastures in the Sierra de Guadarrama, and secondly by the military orders, which received royal grants of pasturelands in the Tagus valley. Documents dated from the late 12th century show that the military Orders were regularly driving their sheep from New Castile into the previously Muslim areas of La Mancha, western Murcia and into the Guadalquivir valley, and it is possible that this transhumance had crossed political boundaries between Christian and Muslim states the before local Christian reconquest.

The third possible cause relates to transhumance organised by the towns of Castile and León. Southern towns, such as Toledo after its 1085 reconquest, sent their flocks to over-winter in the Guadalquivir valley, accompanied by an armed guard. In addition, there was an expansion of transhumant travel south from Segovia and Burgos at the end of the 12th century and the start of the 13th century using cañadas opened by the monasteries, possibly into what was still Muslim territory. However, the victory of Los Navas de Tolosa in 1212 opened the pastures of the Guadiana to all Castilian flocks, not just those of the monasteries and military orders. As the influence of the Castilian urban stockholders increased from the last decades of the 12th century, they increased the numbers of the sheep they were able to support by exploiting these new pastures.

The main north–south cañadas, or Cañadas Reales, were those designated by royal charter, although their precise routes may have changed over time, as they were only marked and given a defined width when crossing cultivated land, not when crossing open or untilled land. Both near their north and south termini, numerous minor local cañadas joined into or branched off from the Cañadas Reales. Klein describes three principal groups of cañadas reales wholly within the kingdom of Castile-León, namely the western, or Leonesa, the central, or Segoviana, and the eastern, or Manchega groups, running through the cities of León, Segovia and Cuenca respectively. Walker splits the Segovian group, adding a fourth group passing through Soria. The Leonese cañadas terminated in Extremadura and in the banks of the Tagus and Guadiana rivers, those of Segovia and Soria, which were the major routes, ended in Andalucía and the Manchegan ones in La Mancha and eastern Murcia. Some authors divide these groups into nine or ten quite separate routes, but Klein noted the possibility of sheep moving between different branches of the western and central groups.

There are very few records of numbers of sheep migrating annually before the early 16th century. In the 16th century, the numbers of migrating sheep recorded annually ranged from 1.7 to 3.5 million, averaging around 2.5 million Merino sheep, but the numbers began to decline in the late 16th and particularly in the early 17th century, a time of warfare in the Low Countries. Klein places the start of the Mesta's decadence in the third quarter of the 16th century. During that period, only Merino sheep migrated, but the proportion of Merinos driven south in any year depended on the spring rainfall in the northern pastures and the fluctuating price of pasture in the south. After the Eighty Years' War, transhumant numbers rose again, but to a lower level than in the 16th century. This was not because of a decline in overall numbers of Merino sheep, but a reduction in long-range transhumance and a parallel increase in flocks pastured in their home areas. Non- migratory Merino flocks of southern cities such as Córdoba also expanded and competed with transhumant flocks.

=== The right of posesión ===
Perhaps the most controversial of the Mesta's privileges was the right of posesión, which established the Mesta's perpetual title to tenancy for all pastures leased by its members. Its origin lay in the Mesta's code for its own internal administration, dated 1492. One clause attempted to prevent competition among the sheep owners for winter pasturage through an arrangement for the joint bargaining for pasture leases by lessees acting for the Mesta. Each of the four quadrillas selected a representative annually, to proceed to Extremadura and Andalucía before the annual migration and arrange the terms of grazing leases for the coming winter season. Each member was only assigned sufficient land for his flocks, and each landowner was to be treated equally. The aim was to prevent competition between Mesta members or joint action by the landowning lessors to raise rents.

The 1492 ordinance was an internal Mesta measure only, but a significant action taken by Ferdinand and Isabella in January 1501 in support of the Mesta was to create a law of posesión, which granted Mesta members the permanent tenancy of a stated pasture field, either at the rental paid under their earliest lease, or if a flocks occupied such fields for a season unchallenged or undiscovered by the landowner, for no payment. The probable intention was to prevent competition for grazing among Mesta members, by guaranteeing the earliest flocks to arrive were given priority for leases. However, the Mesta was able to have an interpretation of the rule of posesión accepted by the courts that was more favourable to its interests, arguing that, as its charter allowed it to represent all sheep owners, it had the right negotiate and allocate all pasturage leases in Castile to prevent disputes or competition between its members.

Although this interpretation was disputed by the landowners of southern Castile, including towns, ecclesiastics, military orders and private individuals, it was upheld by the courts and confirmed in a series of laws passed in 1505. One interpretation, based on the assumption that the privilege of posesión operated strictly in accordance with these laws and could be enforced, was that it retarded the growth of agriculture and had a negative effect on Spain's political development for centuries, a view that ignores the active and passive resistance to this legislation. An alternative view is that the right of posesión was a form of rent control that guaranteed shepherd access to the pastures at stable prices.

The Habsburg monarchs were inconsistent in granting exemptions from the Mesta's privileges, including posesión, in return for payment. However, in 1633, after a sharp downturn in wool sales and the related tax revenue, the rules of posesión were renewed, and pastures converted to arable were ordered to be restored to pasturage. It has been suggested that a weak monarchy and strong local resistance reduced the effect of this measure, but a survey of sheep owners in the province of Soria indicates that far more of them included rights of posesión in their wills in the 17th century, regarding these rights as part of their patrimony, than did so in the 16th century, and that such rights were exchanged between such owners. Although posesión gave rise to frequent legal disputes, these demonstrate an increase in the practice as much as opposition to it.

The first two Spanish Bourbon kings, under the influence of the doctrines of mercantilism current in France, renewed Mesta privileges in 1726 and extended the law of posesión to Aragon. Their action was more successful than the 1633 renewal, as appeals in pasture disputes were moved to a court more favourable to the Mesta. In contrast to his predecessors, Charles III and his reforming ministers regarded posesión as a mediaeval survival that had outlived its usefulness and considered that its continuation inhibited a necessary growth in cereal cultivation. This led, firstly to a restriction of the right of posesión in 1761, and then its complete abolition in 1786.

=== Conflicts involving transhumance ===
Cereal growing inevitably competed with sheep rearing, and the movement of flocks from the Old Castile to Andalucía created conflict between shepherds and the farmers cultivating crops along migration routes, as well as those local owners of sheep in areas of winter pasture. During the 13th and 14th centuries, the widespread introduction of the heavy plough in Old Castile led to increased cereal production and led to the abandonment of marginal cultivation, creating more pasture. The emigration of much of the Muslim population from New Castile to Granada and North Africa also led to the abandonment of areas of dry farming there. These changes favoured stock-raising, and there was probably enough land for both pasture and arable farming at first.

Laws confirming the Mesta's rights and tax privileges were issued seven times in the 14th century. However the frequency with which legislation was restated under relatively strong monarchs, and the absence of confirmatory legislation under weak ones, particularly for much of the 15th century, showed how extensive was resistance to the Mesta's privileges, as it required the Crown's support to enforce obedience to the laws protecting its members. There is ample evidence from this period of disputes over unauthorised tolls and encroachment on the cañadas, and ploughing of pastures which might only be used for a few months a year. In theory, the Mesta had the right of pasturage and transit over all land except that in use for growing cereals, vineyards, orchards, hay meadows producing winter feed for cattle and land reserved for deer, but these mediaeval privileges had ceased to exist in reality by the end of the 15th century, largely because the frequency of encroachments on pasturelands and the numbers of unjustified tolls swamped the courts with far more cases than they could deal with adequately.

Itinerant judicial officials, each termed an Entregador, were tasked with keeping open the cañadas and their watering and resting stations, resisting encroachments on public pastures and protecting the shepherds. Initially one such official patrolled each of the four main cañada systems, but their numbers were increased to six in the late 15th century, then later reduced to only three in 1650. They were initially appointed by the Crown to protect the interests of the Mesta and adjudicate in disputes it had with towns and the landowners along the transhumant routes. In 1568, the Entregadors became officers of the Mesta, and lost the prestige of being royal officials.

Flocks migrating south required stops for rest, feeding and watering om route and were vulnerable to excessive charges there, and to excessive rents charged at their destinations by owners of winter pastures. The shepherds had little alternative to paying or risking heavy livestock losses. The military orders also opposed the attempts of northern pastoralists to use winter grazing in their territories. The strong monarchy of the late 15th and 16th centuries, which supported the export of merino wool, was better able to protect the members of the Mesta and the emergence of the right of posesión in the 16th century, attempted to control these charges and rents and guarantee shepherds access to the pastures at fixed prices, although there was increasing pressure for new arable farmland to be brought into use in the 18th century.

Under the later Habsburg monarchs, there was increasing resistance to the passage of transhumant flocks. This led to the decline in smaller owners being involved in transhumance and the dominance of the Mesta by those with very large flocks, who had the money to pay for grazing along migration routes and the political influence to enforce their rights. The towns en route either tried to dissuade or divert transhumant flocks from their territory, or to extract as much as they could by leasing their pastures for flocks on their way to and from the south. Although, in theory, the Mesta's legal rights were clear and the association had an impressive apparatus to enforce them, these rights were breached when routes of the cañadas were moved away to fertile pastures or restricted to below their legal width, and illegal dues were imposed. Even where the Mesta's right were restored after lengthy court proceedings, those that had infringed them usually received no financial or other penalty. Both summer and winter pastures used by transhumant sheep were supposed to remain unploughed and unsown, as was reconfirmed by a royal decree of 1748. In the 18th century, this uncultivated land came under great pressure as the numbers of transhumant sheep doubled, but rents for pasture were fixed and the land could not be used for crops.

During the 17th century, the powers and incomes of the Entregadors were steadily eroded by the courts, and the government granted exemptions from the Entregadors' jurisdiction to towns willing to pay for them and, by the end of that century they were virtually powerless against the courts and exempted towns, although the office remained in existence for another century. By the start of the 18th century, local officials had taken over control of their towns’ grazing grounds, and had enclosing them on the basis that they were so covered with undergrowth as to be useless as pasturage, whether or mot this was accurate. By this time, the Mesta had suffered severely from the general economic decay of the 17th century, and its weakened Entregadors could no longer successfully oppose these local interests.

== Evolution of the Mesta 16th to 18th centuries ==
Klein regarded the reign of Ferdinand and Isabela as the golden age of the Mesta, as their aggressive promotion of wool exports, reform of local taxes and dues, ensuring that the collection of what should have been royal taxes on sheep were collected only by royal agents, efficiently and at much lower rates than under the Hapsburg kings, and extending and enforcing pasture privileges for transhumant flocks and enforcing these put the members of the Mesta in a more favourable position than they had under later monarchs. The Emperor Charles V greatly increased taxes on wool production and impose forced loans in the Mesta to fund his ambitions outside Spain, and Klein argued that the wool trade started to decline from the 1560s, when Philip II further increased export taxes on it, and that the Mesta never fully revived.

However, the fortunes of the Mesta fluctuated throughout its existence rather than steadily declining from the late 16th century, particularly as the importance of its non-transhumant flocks increased after the mid-17th century. The Mesta did undergo a crisis in the early-to-mid 17th century, a time of warfare in northern Europe and a consequent European economic crisis, which caused a disruption in the wool trade and increase in the cost of grazing that made transhumance unprofitable and led to a reduction in the numbers of transhumant sheep, but it recovered.

The Mesta originated, firstly, because the dry climate of the central Meseta and the sparse population of areas conquered from the Muslims between the 11th and 13th centuries made the transhumant raising of sheep the most efficient use of its land. The continuation of its activities in the 15th and 16th centuries depended on the introduction of the Merino breed, whose fine wool supported the growth of the Italian wool textile industry and allowed that of the Low Counties to overcome the decline in English wool exports. Even though the Andalusian plains that could have supported intensive wheat cultivation, the need for winter pastures and their relatively low population before the 18th century prevented this development.

Secondly, the Mesta was an important source of royal income from the 13th century. Alfonso X wished to tax the transhumant flocks and their wool, and his charter of 1273 reserved certain taxes for the Crown and limited the levies that others could charge. Although Castile had an impressive and all-encompassing tax system in theory, in practice the Crown was largely dependent on a sales tax, and much of what the Crown actually received in the 16th and 17th centuries was collected by the Mesta on wool exports. The king received little of whatever other tax revenues were collected, as these were retained by the cities or nobles. The royal sheep taxes became a critical source of income under the Habsburgs and early Bourbons, and these taxes and forced loans imposed on the Mesta made its continuation essential to the Spanish exchequer.

As long as transhumant sheep continued to produce merino wool and the tax on wool exports continued to be a major source of royal income, the Mesta could continue. Warfare within Spain during the War of the Spanish Succession and the Peninsular War disrupted the annual migrations and, the latter particularly, devastated many flocks. External European conflicts such as the Eighty Years' War could also hinder exports of wool. Although the numbers of sheep controlled by the Mesta recovered after each conflict, the recovery after the Peninsular War was only partial.

=== 18th century recovery ===
After a period of virtual bankruptcy in the late 17th century, when the weak government of Charles II was detrimental to the Mesta, a recovery under the first two Bourbon monarchs reversed this trend, particularly after the War of the Spanish Succession ended, largely because the government enforced the Mesta's privileges with greater rigour. The numbers of transhumant sheep doubled between 1708 and 1780 to reach an historical peak around 1780, assisted by the royal decree of 1748, which confirmed that both summer and winter pastures must remain unploughed and unsown, unless royal permission for ploughing was granted.

In the 18th century, as legislation controlling the price of pastures became more effectively enforced, the volume of wool exports increased. This was assisted by a decline in the Spanish population in the late 17th and early 18th centuries, which reduced the cultivation of grain. Increased prices for wool exports and the prohibition on returning pastures to arable prevented a growth in cultivation until pressure from reformers after the accession of Charles III forced through agrarian reforms. However, there is no evidence of the failure of the Mesta's institutions before the late eighteenth and early nineteenth century.

== Decline of the Mesta ==
The late 18th century attack on the Mesta was undertaken followers of the Enlightenment in Spain with support from Charles III. They considered that the benefit of fine wool exports was outweighed by its damage to agriculture, but based their views more on the success of the Agricultural Revolution that was taking place in different conditions in northern Europe than on actual conditions in Spain. However, instead of proposing a balance between agriculture and pastoralism, they promoted cultivation exclusively, claiming that even the driest lands with the thinnest soils could be made profitable for agriculture with the appropriate combination of seeds, cultivation techniques and manure, underestimating the actual benefit of transhumant sheep in manuring areas along their routes.

Pressure from would-be cultivators, in the face of Mesta opposition, enabled wheat to be grown on former pastures in the Andalusian plains, despite an immediate loss of royal income from wool taxes. These early reforming impulses of Charles III had no immediate effect on the Mesta's prosperity, which reached its highest monetary level between 1763 and 1785, although the rising price of cereals in this period and the start of a decline in wool prices suggested this prosperity was fragile.

Charles III had little interest in supporting the Mesta, and he allowed its freedom of transit to be abused by towns and landowners. His actions and inaction in the last two decades of the 18th century, made regular transhumance increasingly difficult and pushed the Mesta into a terminal decline. The social and commercial reforms of Charles and Campomanes included a significant reduction in Mesta pasture rights by granting towns the freedom to use their common lands as they wished in 1761, and giving local sedentary flocks preference to over transhumant ones for Extremaduran pasturage in 1783. These measures began to have an adverse effect on the Mesta in the last decades of the 18th century. However, a very cold winter in 1779-80 that killed many sheep and a critical reduction in fine wool exports caused by declining demand were also important, as they intensified the effects of reduced availability and increased costs of winter pastures in reversing its fortunes. Prices for fine wool decreased substantially between 1782 and 1799, and more dramatically between 1800 until the catastrophe of the French invasion in 1808. That invasion completely disrupted the traditional patterns of transhumance and wool production, although the regime of Joseph Bonaparte attempted to revive the latter, with limited success.

Although Merino sheep had been exported from Spain in the 18th century, the greatest effect of the loss of Spain's virtual monopoly of producing the finest quality wools was felt in the early 19th century, when the disruption caused by the Peninsular War, which persisted for several years after the war ended, led to a decline in quantity and quality of Spanish wool produced, and allowed foreign producers of merino wool to prosper.

In the aftermath of the Peninsular War, Ferdinand VII again ratified the Mesta's privileges in 1816 and 1827, reversing the reforms of Charles III. This was similar to the support that Philip IV had given during the early-17th century crisis, suggesting that royal support was more secure in times of crisis for the Mesta than when its 18th century expansion made it a target for Charles III's reforms. However, the legal situation in the early 19th century did not reflect the actual weakness of the Mesta or the strength of the opposition to it of agriculturalists and the towns. Neither could Royal support counter the growth of merino wool production in South America, Australia and South Africa, nor the competition from the wool of other breeds that approached it for fineness. After 1808, almost all the limited quantity of Spanish wool exports were of reduced quality and sold to Britain, and the numbers of transhumant sheep fell from 2.75 million in 1818 to 1.11 million in 1832. During the latter stages of the Peninsular War, the Cortes of Cadiz, inspired by the doctrines of liberalism, attacked the privileges of the Mesta. These were attacked again by the liberal government of the Trienio Liberal, which replaced the Mesta with a short-lived state body. Although the Mesta was reinstated in the absolutist restoration of 1823, it was weakened and tainted by its association with absolutism.

The Mesta had no place in the new social and political order introduced by the liberal government that the Regent Maria Christina had appointed in 1833. In 1835 and 1836, the Mesta lost all its private judicial powers, which were transferred to a new Associación General de Ganaderos (General Association of Herdsmen), and also its tax privileges and, on 5 November 1836, its dissolution was completed and the Mesta itself was dissolved.

== Bibliography ==
- I. J. de Asso y del Rio and M de Manuel y Rodriguez, (1805). Institutes of the Civil Law of Spain, sixth edition. translated by L. F. Johnstone, 1825. London, Butterworth.
- L. M. Bilbao and E. F. de Pinedo, (1994). Wool Exports Transhumance and Land Use in Castile in the 16th, 17th and 18th Centuries, in A. A. Thompson, B. Yun Casalilla and B. Yun (editors), The Castilian Crisis of the Seventeenth Century, Cambridge University Press. ISBN 978-0-52141-624-5.
- C. J. Bishko, (1963) The Castilian as Plainsman: The Medieval Ranching Frontier in La Mancha and Extremadura. in A. R. Lewis and T. F. McGann (eds), The New World Looks at its History. Austin, University of Texas Press.
- C. J. Bishko, (1978). The Andalusian Municipal Mestas in the 14th-16th Centuries: Administrative and Social Aspects. Córdoba, Actas del I Congreso de Historia de Andalucía, Vol. 1, pp 347–374. ISBN 84-500-2609-1.
- C. J. Bishko, (1980) Studies in Medieval Spanish Frontier History. London: Variorum Reprints. ISBN 0-86078-069-4.
- F. Braudel, translated by S. Reynolds, (1995). The Mediterranean and the Mediterranean World in the Age of Philip II: Volume I. Berkeley, University of California Press. ISBN 978-0-52020-308-2.
- K. W. Butzer, (1988) Cattle and Sheep from Old to New Spain: Historical Antecedents. Annals of the Association of American Geographers, Vol. 78, No. 1, pp. 29–56.
- A. L. Cahn, (2008). El espíritu del lugar en las Cañadas Reales de la Corona de Castilla. Revista de Urbanismo, Vol. 19, pp. 1–19.
- M. Diago Hernando, (2002). La aplicación en la Sierra Soriano del Derecho de Posesión Mesteño a los Agostaderos durante el Siglo XVII. Estudios Agrosociales y Pesqueros, No. 195, pp. 61–79.
- P. García Martín, (1992). La Ganderia Mesteña en la España Borbonica, (1700–1836), 2nd edition. Madrid, Ministerio de Agricultura. ISBN 84-7479-939-2.
- A. García Sanz, (1978). "La agonía de la Mesta y el hundimiento de las exportaciones laneras: un capítulo de la crisis económica del Antiguo Régimen en España. Revista Agricultura y Sociedad, nº 6. pp. 283 –356
- A. García Sanz, (1998). Los Privilegios Mesteños en el Tiempo, 1273–1836: Una Revisión de la Obra de Julius Klein. in F. Ruíz Martín and A. García Sanz (eds.), Mesta, Trashumancia y Lana en la España Moderna. Barcelona, Crítica. ISBN 84-7423-847-1.
- A. Gilman and J. B. Thornes, (2014). Land-use and Prehistory in South-East Spain, (revised edition). London, Routledge. ISBN 978-1-31760-475-4.
- E. S. Higgs, (1976). The History of European agriculture — the Upland. Phil. Trans. R. Soc. Land. B. Vol. 275, pp. 159–173.
- J. F. Hough and R. Grier (2015). The Long Process of Development: Building Markets and States in Pre-Industrial England, Spain and their Colonies. Cambridge University Press. ISBN 978-1-10767-041-9.
- J. Klein, (1920), The Mesta: A Study in Spanish Economic History 1273–1836. Harvard University Press.
- R. S. López, (1996) El origen de la oveja Merina. In P. García Martín and J. M. Sánchez Benito (editors). Contribución a la historia de la trashumancia en España. Madrid, Ministerio de Agricultura. ISBN 978-8-47479-496-0.
- McAlister, Lyle N. (1984). Spain & Portugal in the New World: 1492–1700. Minneapolis: University of Minnesota Press. pp. 19–21..
- F. Marín Barriguete, (1992). Mesta y Vida Pastoril. Revista de Historia Moderna. Vol. 11, pp. 127–142.
- F. Marín Barriguete, (2015). La Legislación de la Trashumancia en Castilla (Siglo XVIII). Facultad de Derecho Universidad Complutense de Madrid. ISBN 978-8 46084-778-6.
- M. Á. Melón Jiménez, (2004). La Ganadería Española en la Edad Moderna. Actas de la VIIª Reunión Científica de la Fundación Española de Historia Moderna, pp. 727–70.
- J. F. O’Callaghan, (1985). Paths to Ruin: The Economic and Financial Policies of Alfonso the Learned. in R. I. Burns, ed The Worlds of Alfonso the Learned and James the Conqueror, pp. 41–67. Princeton University Press.
- E. Pascua Echegaray, (2007). Las Otras Comunidades: Pastores y Ganaderos en la Castilla Medieval. in Ana Rodriguez (ed). El Lugar del Campesino: En torno a la obra de Reyna Pastor. pp. 209–237. Universitat de Valencia. ISBN 978-8-43706-393-5.
- R. Pastor de Togneri, (1996). La Lana en Castilla y León antes de la organización de la Mesta. In P. García Martín and J. M. Sánchez Benito (editors), Contribución a la Historia de la Trashumancia en España. Madrid, Ministerio de Agricultura. ISBN 978-8-47479-496-0.
- C. Rahn Phillips and W. D. Philips Jnr. (1997). Spain's Golden Fleece: Wool Production and the Wool Trade from the Middle Ages to the Nineteenth Century. Johns Hopkins University Press. ISBN 978-0-801855-18-4.
- B.F Reilly, (1993). The Medieval Spains. Cambridge University Press. ISBN 0-521-39741-3.
- L. Reitzer, (1960), Some Observations on Castilian Commerce and Finance in the Sixteenth Century. The Journal of Modern History, Vol. 32, No. 3, pp. 213–223.
- M. J. Walker, (1983), Laying a Mega-Myth: Dolmens and Drovers in Prehistoric Spain. World Archaeology, Vol. 15, No. 1, pp. 37–50.
