= Agriculture in the Middle Ages =

Farming practices from 476 to c. 1500

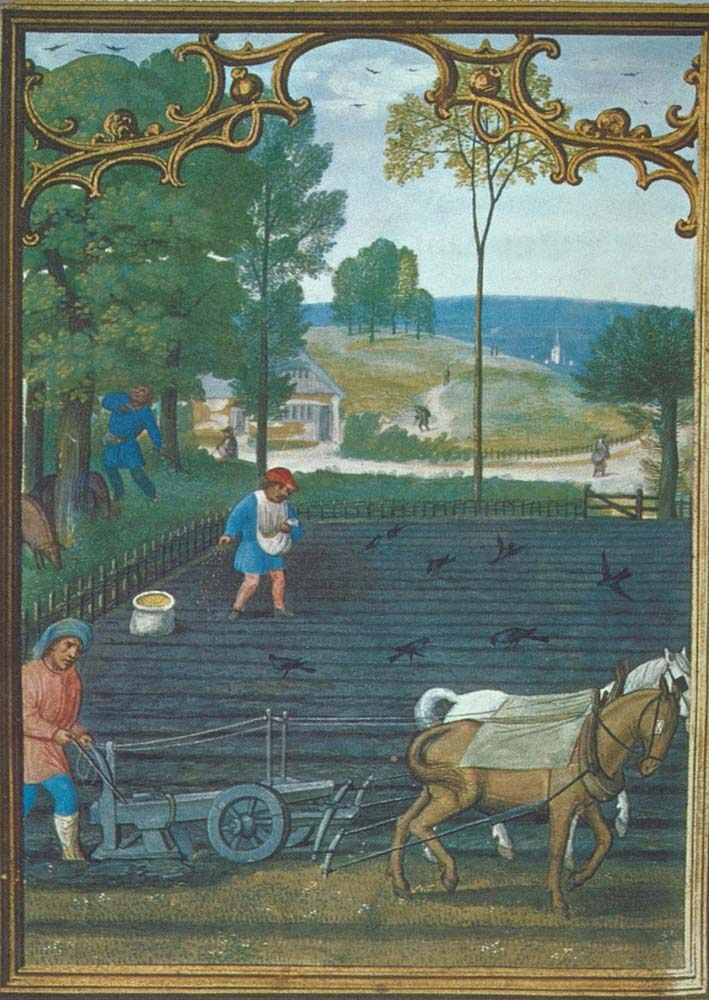
Farming in the Middle Ages

Agriculture in the Middle Ages describes the farming practices, crops, technology, and agricultural society and economy of Europe from the fall of the Western Roman Empire in 476 to approximately 1500. The Middle Ages are sometimes called the Medieval Age or Period. The Middle Ages are also divided into the Early, High, and Late Middle Ages. The early modern period followed the Middle Ages.

Epidemics and climatic cooling caused a large decrease in the European population in the 6th century. Compared to the Roman period, agriculture in the Middle Ages in Western Europe became more focused on self-sufficiency. The Feudal period began about 1000. The agricultural population under feudalism in Northern Europe was typically organized into manors consisting of several hundred or more acres of land presided over by a Lord of the manor, with a Roman Catholic church and priest. Most of the people living on the manor were peasant farmers or serfs who grew crops for themselves, and either labored for the lord and church or paid rent for their land. Barley and wheat were the most important crops in most European regions; oats and rye were also grown, along with a variety of vegetables and fruits. Oxen and horses were used as draft animals. Sheep were raised for wool and pigs were raised for meat.

Crop failures due to bad weather were frequent throughout the Middle Ages and famine was often the result.

The medieval system of agriculture began to break down in the 14th century with the development of more intensive agricultural methods in the Low Countries and after the population losses of the Black Death in 1347–1351 made more land available to a diminished number of farmers. Medieval farming practices, however, continued with little change in the Slavic regions and some other areas until the mid-19th century.

== Background ==
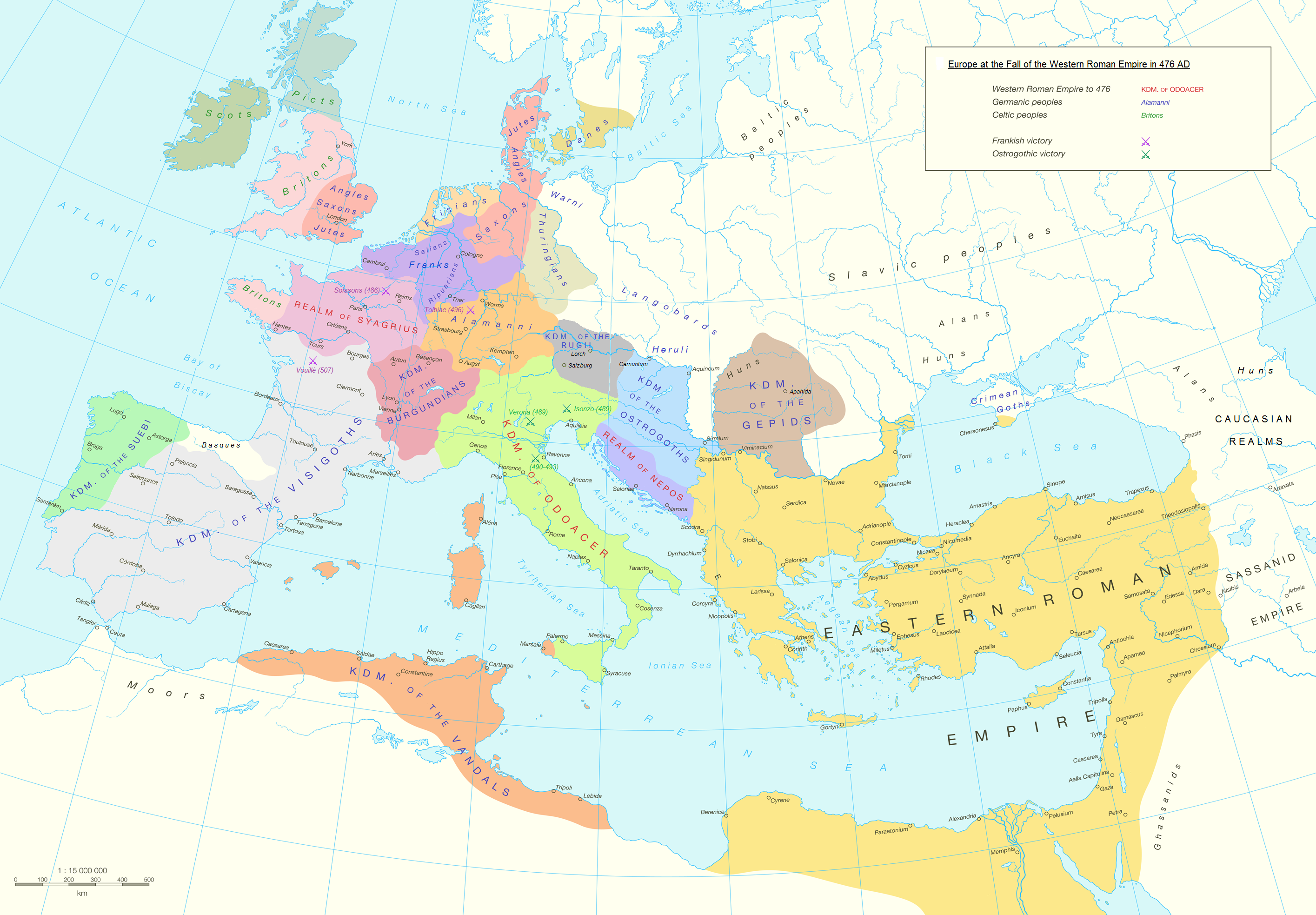
Europe and the Middle East in 476 after the fall of the last Western Roman Emperor.

Three events set the stage for medieval agriculture—and would influence agriculture for centuries—in Europe. First was the fall of the western Roman Empire which began to lose territory to foreign 'barbarian' invaders about the year 400. The last western Roman emperor abdicated in 476. Thereafter, the lands and people of the former western Roman Empire would be divided among different ethnic groups, whose rule was often ephemeral and constantly in flux. Unifying factors of Europe included the gradual adoption of the Christian religion by most Europeans and in western Europe the use of Latin as the common language of international communication, scholarship, and science. Greek had a similar status in the Eastern Roman Empire.

Secondly was the Late Antique Little Ice Age, an era of global cooling which started in 536 and ended around 660. The cooling was caused by volcanic eruptions in 536, 540, and 547. The Byzantine historian Procopius wrote of the fallout that "the sun put forth its light without brightness." Summer temperatures in Europe dropped as much as 2.5 °C (4.5 °F) and the sky was dimmed from volcanic dust in the atmosphere for 18 months, sufficient to cause crop failures and famine. Temperatures remained lower than the preceding Roman period for more than one hundred years. The ice age preceded, and may have influenced, a number of disruptive events, including pandemics, human migration, and political turmoil.

Third, was the Plague of Justinian which began in 541, spread throughout Europe, and recurred periodically until 750. The plague may have killed up to 25 percent of the people of the eastern Roman or Byzantine Empire and a similar percentage in western and northern Europe. The combined impact on the population of climatic cooling and the plague led to reduced harvests of grain. John of Ephesus' account of travel through rural areas speaks of "crops of wheat...white and standing but there was no one to reap them and store the wheat" and "Vineyards, whose picking season came and went" with nobody to pick and press the grapes. John also speaks of the "severe winter", presumably caused by volcanic dust.

The consequence of these factors was that the population of Europe was substantially less in 600 than it had been in 500. One scholar estimates that the population on the Italian peninsula decreased from 11 million in 500 to 8 million in 600 and remained at that level for nearly 300 years. The declines in the population of other parts of Europe were probably of similar magnitude.

== The Early Middle Ages ==
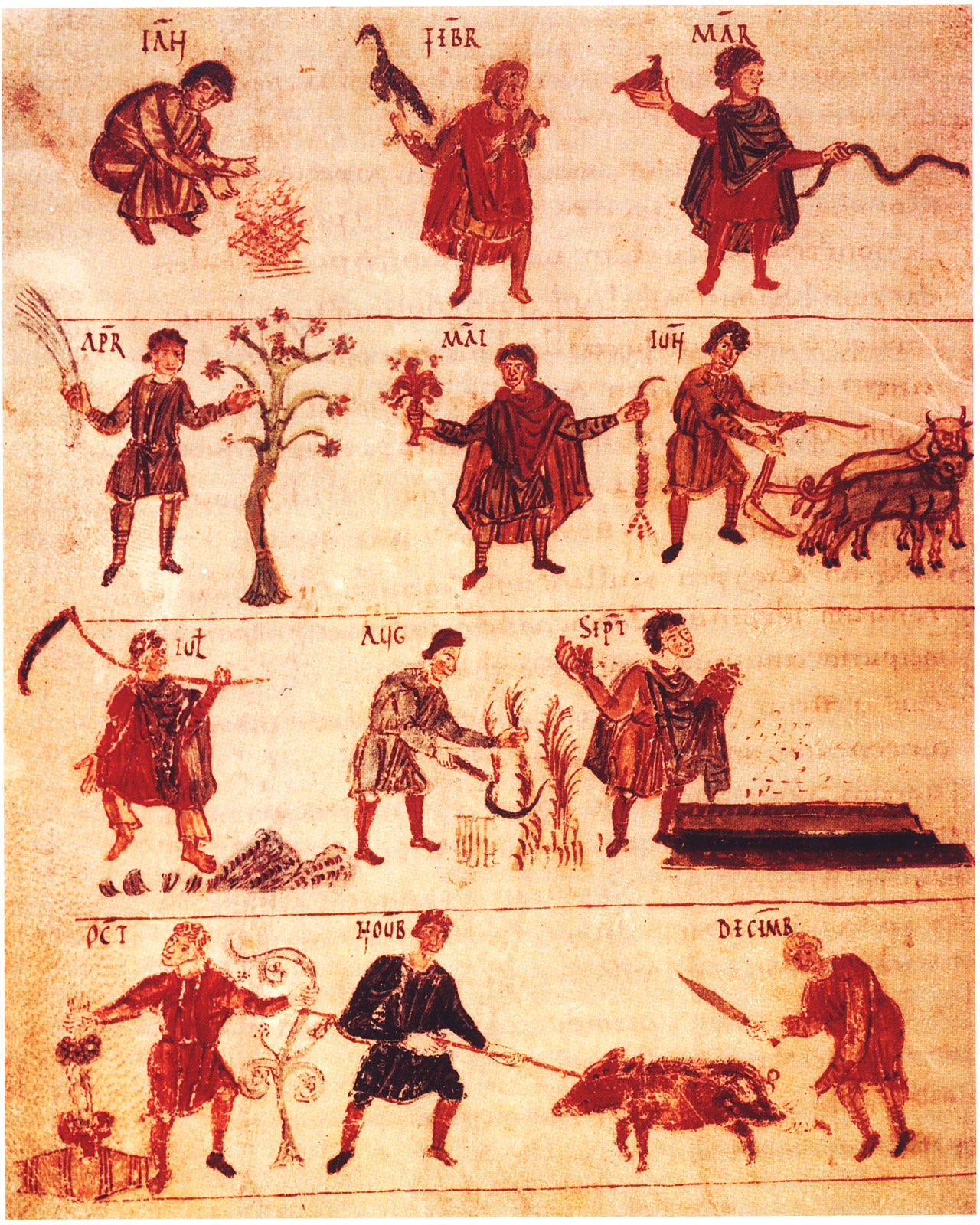
Labours of the Months, Salzburg Manuscript 818

The popular view is that the fall of the Western Roman Empire caused what Petrarch would later call "dark ages" in western Europe in which notionally "knowledge and civility", the "arts of elegance," and "many of the useful arts" were neglected or lost. Conversely, however, the lot of the farmers who made at least 80 percent of the total population, may have improved in the aftermath of the Roman Empire. The fall of Rome saw the "shrinking of tax burdens, weakening of the aristocracy, and consequently greater freedom for peasants." The countryside of the Roman Empire was dotted with "villas" or estates, characterized by Pliny the Elder as "the ruin of Italy." The estates were owned by wealthy aristocrats and worked in part by slaves. More than 1,500 villas are known to have existed in England alone. With the fall of Rome, the villas were abandoned or transformed into utilitarian rather than elite uses. "In western Europe, then, we seem to see the effect of a release from the pressure of the Roman imperial market, army and taxation, and a return to farming based more on local needs."

The population declines of the 6th century, and, thus, a shortage of labor may have facilitated greater freedom among rural people who were either slaves or had been bound to the land under Roman law.

Europe at the death of Charlemagne, 814.

The Eastern Roman Empire. Early in the Middle Ages the agricultural history of the Eastern Roman Empire differed from that of western Europe. The 5th and 6th centuries saw an expansion of market-oriented and industrial farming, especially of olive oil and wine, and the adoption of new technology such as oil and wine presses. The settlement patterns in the east were also different than the west. Rather than the villas of the Roman Empire in the west, the farmers of the east lived in villages which continued to exist and even expand.

Iberian peninsula. The Iberian Peninsula seems to have had a different experience than eastern and western Europe. There is evidence of abandonment of farmland and reforestation due to depopulation, but also evidence of expanded grazing and market-oriented livestock raising of horses, mules, and donkeys. The economy of the Iberian peninsula seems to have become disconnected from the rest of Europe and, instead, it became a major trading partner of North Africa in the fifth century, long before the Umayyad conquest of the peninsula in 711.

== Agriculture in Iberia ==
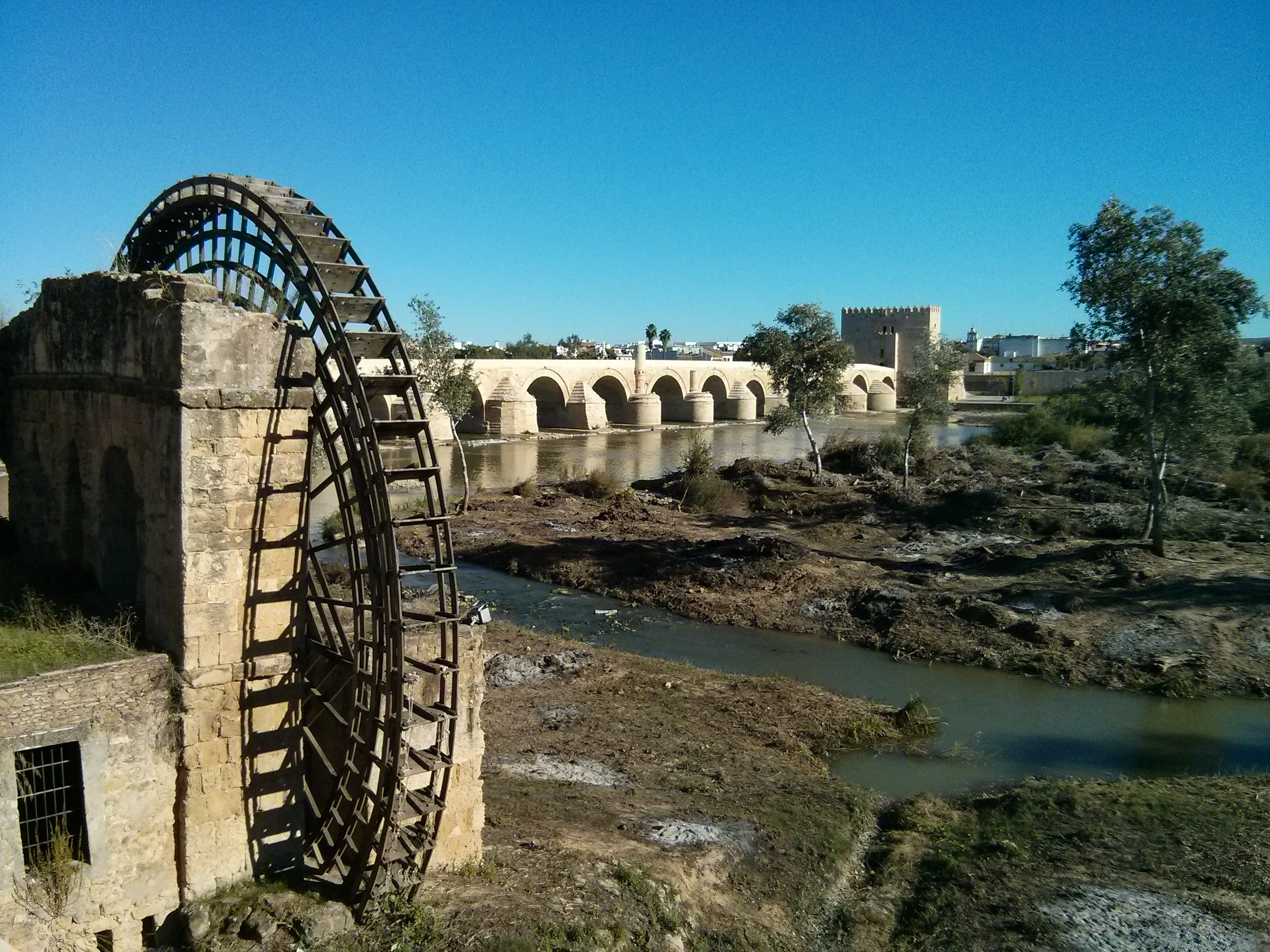
A Roman bridge and an Islamic water wheel for irrigation in Cordova, Spain.

In what historian Andrew Watson called the Arab Agricultural Revolution, the Arab Muslim rulers of much of Al Andalus (8th through the 15th centuries) introduced or popularized a large number of new crops and new agricultural technology into the Iberian peninsula (Spain and Portugal). The crops introduced by the Arabs included sugar cane, rice, hard wheat (durum), citrus, cotton, and figs. Many of these crops required sophisticated methods of irrigation, water management, and "agricultural technologies such as crop rotation, management of pests, and fertilizing crops by natural means." Some scholars have questioned how much of the Arab (or Muslim) Agricultural Revolution was unique, and how much was a revival and expansion of technology developed in the Middle East during the centuries of Roman rule. Whether credit of invention belongs mostly to the people of the Middle East during the Roman Empire or to the arrival of the Arabs, "the Iberian landscape changed profoundly" beginning in the 8th century.

== Feudalism ==
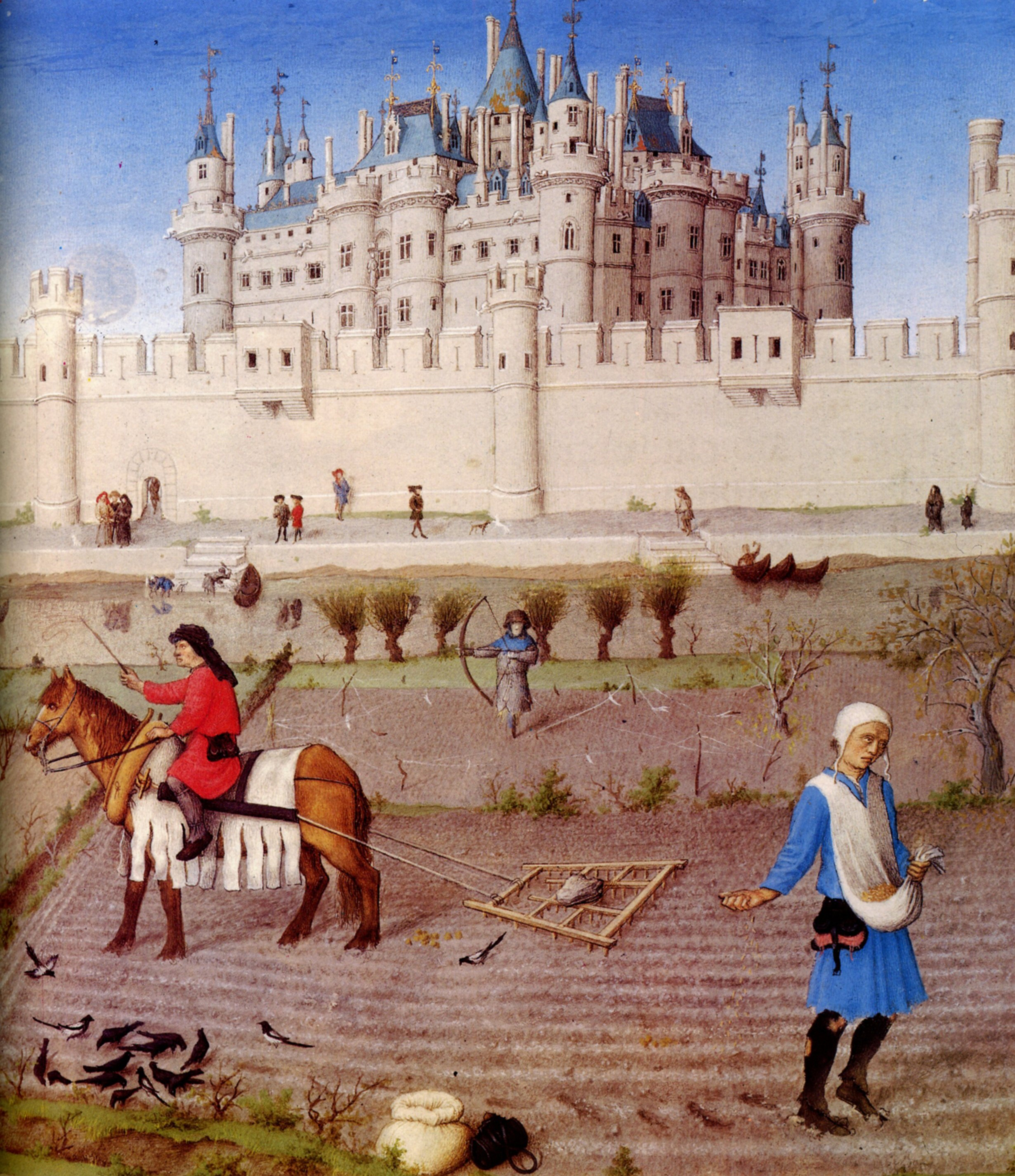
Peasants preparing the fields for the winter with a harrow and sowing for the winter grain. The background shows the Louvre castle in Paris, c. 1410; October as depicted in the Très Riches Heures du Duc de Berry.

Gradually, the Roman system of villas and agricultural estates using partly slave labor was replaced by manorialism and serfdom. Historian Peter Sarris has identified the characteristics of feudal society in sixth century Italy, and even earlier in the Byzantine Empire and Egypt. One of the differences between the villa and medieval manor was that the agriculture of the villa was commercially oriented and specialized while the manor was directed toward self-sufficiency.

Slavery was important for the agricultural labor force of the Roman Empire, and died out in western Europe by 1100. The slaves of the Roman Empire were property, like livestock, with no rights of personhood and could be sold or traded at the will of his owner. Similarly, the serf was tied to the land and could not leave his servitude, but his tenure on the land was secure. If the manor changed owners the serfs remained on the land. Serfs had limited rights to property, although their freedom of movement was limited and they owed labor or rent to their lord.

Feudalism was in full flower for most of northern Europe by 1000 and its heartland was the rich agricultural lands in the Seine valley of France and the Thames valley of England. The medieval population was divided into three groups: 'those who pray' (clergy), 'those who fight' (knights, soldiers, aristocrats), and 'those who work' (peasants). The serf and farmer supported with labor and taxes the clergy who prayed and the noble lords, knights, and warriors who fought. In return the farmer received the services of the church and protection by mounted and heavily armored soldiers. The church took its tithe and the soldiers required a large economic investment. A social and legal gulf resulted between the priest, the knight, and the farmer. Moreover, with the end of the Carolingian Empire (800–888), the power of kings declined and the central authority was little felt. Thus, the European countryside became a patchwork of small, semi-autonomous fiefdoms of lords and clergy ruling over a populace mostly of farmers, some relatively prosperous, some possessing land, and some landless.

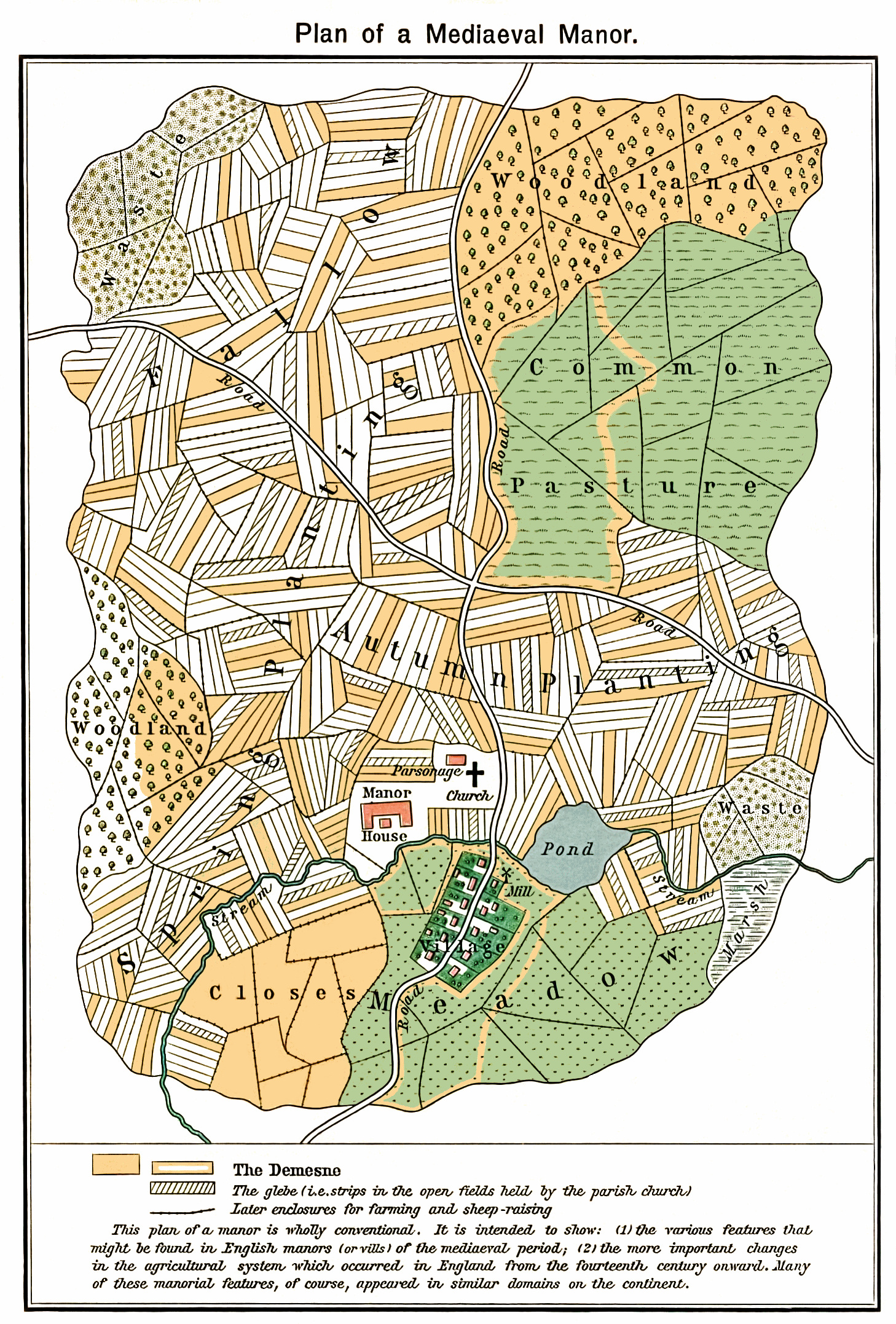
The plan of a hypothetical European medieval manor with the open-field system.

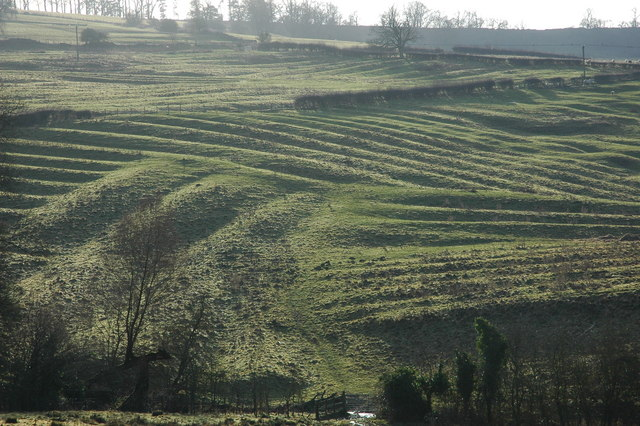
Farmers typically owned more than a dozen long and narrow strips of land scattered among the ridge and furrows

A major factor contributing to the death of feudalism in most of Europe was the Black Death of 1347–1351 and subsequent epidemics which killed one-third or more of the people of Europe. In the aftermath of the Black Death, land was abundant and labor was scarce and the rigid relationships among farmers, the church, and the nobility changed. Feudalism is generally regarded as having ended in western Europe around 1500, although serfs were not finally freed in Russia until 1861.

The Manor. Agricultural land in the Middle Ages under feudalism was usually organized in manors. The medieval manor consisted of several hundred (or sometimes thousand) acres of land. A large manor house served as the home or part-time home of the lord of the manor. Some manors were under the authority of bishops or abbots of the Catholic church. Some lords owned more than one manor, and the church controlled large areas. Within the lands of a manor, a parish church and a nucleated village housing the farmers was usually near the manor house. The manor house, church, and village were surrounded by cultivated and fallow land, woods, and pasture. Some of the land was the demesne of the lord; some was allocated to individual farmers, and some to the parish priest. Some of the woods and pasture were held in common and used for grazing and wood-gathering. Most manors had a mill for grinding grain into flour and an oven to bake bread.

== Fields ==
The three field system common to Medieval Europe.

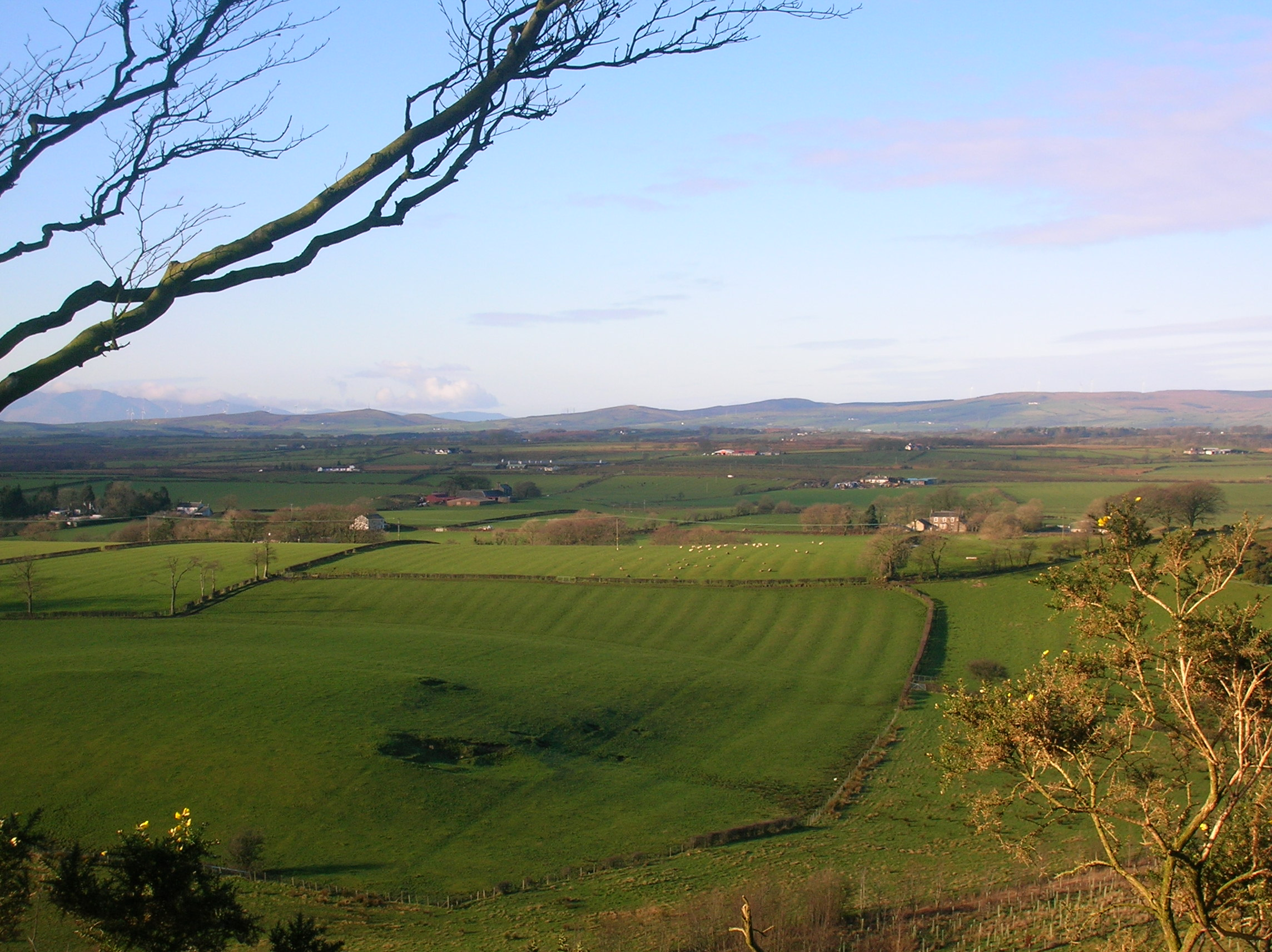
The distinctive ridge and furrow pattern of the Middle Ages survive in this open field in Scotland.

The field systems in medieval Europe included the open-field system, so called because there were no barriers between fields belonging to different farmers. The landscape was one of long and uncluttered views. In its archetypal form, cultivated land consisted of long, narrow strips of land in a distinctive ridge and furrow pattern. Individual farmers owned or farmed several different strips of land scattered around the farming area. The reason for farmers possessing scattered strips of land was apparently to reduce risk; if the crop in one strip failed, it might thrive in another strip. The lord of the manor also had strips of land scattered around the fields as did the parish priest for the upkeep of the church. The open-field system required cooperation among the residents of the community and with the lord and the priest. "Strips of land were cultivated individually, yet were subject to communal rotations and (typically) communal regulation of cropping."

Two patterns of cultivation were typical of the open-field system. In the first, the arable land was divided into two fields. One half was cultivated and the other one was left fallow every year. Crops were rotated between the two fields every year, with the fallow field being allowed to recover its fertility and used for livestock grazing when not dedicated to crops. The two-field system continued to be most prevalent throughout the Middle Ages in dry-summer Mediterranean climates in which grain crops were planted in autumn and harvested in spring, the summer being too dry for spring-planted crops to prosper.

A three-field pattern was typical of the later Middle Ages in northern Europe with its wetter climate. One field was planted in autumn, one field was planted in spring, and the third field was left fallow. Crops were rotated from year to year and field to field. Thus, cultivation was more intensive than it was under the two-field pattern. In both patterns, common areas of wood and pasture as well as fallowed fields were used for communal grazing and wood-gathering.

The woods and meadows comprising common lands were open to exploitation to all farmers in the manor, but under strict management of the number of livestock allowed each farmer to avoid over grazing. Fallow fields were treated as common lands for grazing.

The open-field system had a more individualistic, less-communal variant, usually prevalent in less productive areas for agriculture. The strips of land cultivated by farmers were more concentrated, sometimes into a single block of land rather than scattered holdings. Crop decisions were often made by individuals or a small group of farmers rather than a whole village. An individual farmer might possess not only cultivated land, but woods and pastures, rather than the commons of the pure open-field system. Villages were often strung out along a road rather than nucleated as in the archetypal open-field system.

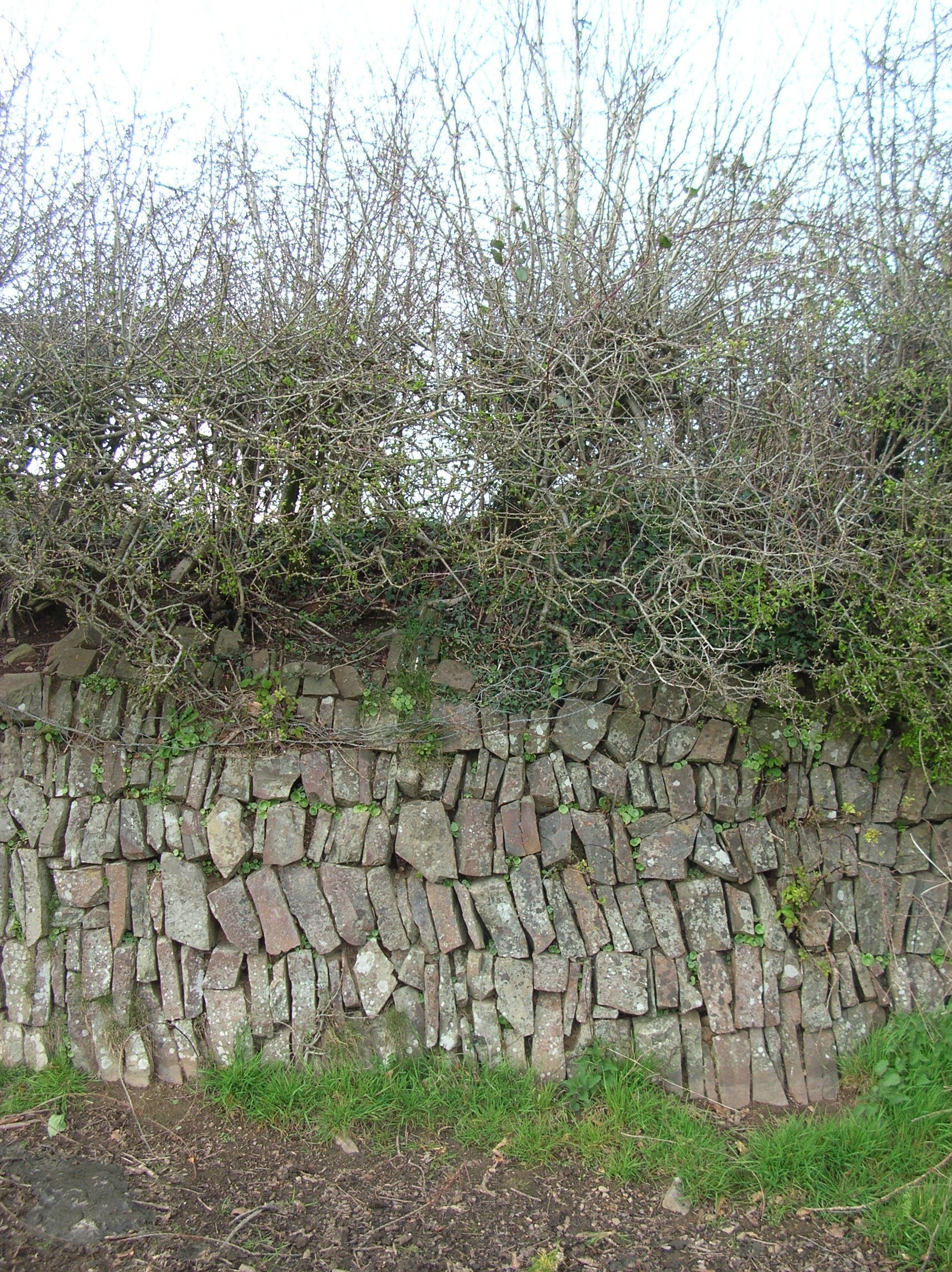
A stone faced hedge dividing fields in southwestern England.

An enclosed field system was found mostly in pastoral areas, areas of mixed farming and pasture, and more marginal farming areas. The enclosed field system was characterized by individual decision making. Farmers typically enclosed their land with hedgerows, stones, or trees. The village church was often at a prominent location and houses were scattered rather than collected into a village. This individualistic field system was found in eastern and southwestern England, Normandy and Brittany in France, and scattered throughout Europe.

== Farmers' holdings ==
Farmers were not equal in the amount of land they farmed. In a survey of seven English counties in 1279, perhaps typical of Europe as a whole, 46 percent of farmers held less than 10 acres (4.0 ha), which was insufficient land to support a family. Some were completely landless, or possessed only a small garden adjacent to their house. These poor farmers were often employed by richer farmers, or practiced a trade in addition to farming.

Thirty-three percent of farmers held about one-half virgate of land (12 acres (4.9 ha) to 16 acres (6.5 ha)), sufficient in most years to support a family. Twenty percent of farmers held about a full virgate, sufficient not only to support a family but to produce a surplus. A few farmers accumulated more than a virgate of land and thus were relatively wealthy, although not belonging to the nobility. These rich farmers might have tenants of their own and would hire labor to work their lands.

Thirty-two percent of arable land was held by the lord of the manor. The farmers of the manor were required to work for a specified number of days per year on the lord's land or to pay rent to the lord on the land they farmed.

== Crops ==
In the late Roman Empire in Europe the most important crops were bread wheat in Italy and barley in northern Europe and the Balkans. Near the Mediterranean Sea viticulture and olives were important. Rye and oats were only slowly becoming major crops. The Romans introduced viticulture to more northerly areas such as Paris and the valleys of the Moselle and Rhine rivers. Cultivation of olives in medieval France was traditional on the southeastern coast bordering on Italy, but apparently the cultivation of olives in Languedoc on a large scale began in areas only in the 15th century.

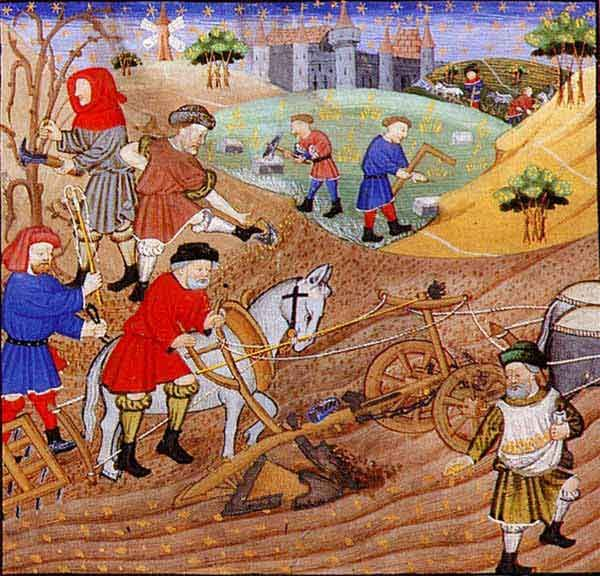
Agrarian practices, including advanced planting and harvesting methods, detailed by Giles of Rome in 1279

In Roman times, spelt, a kind of wheat, was the most common grain grown on the upper Danube River in Swabia, Germany, and spelt continued to be an important crop in many areas of Europe throughout medieval times. Emmer wheat was of much less importance in Swabia and most of Europe. Bread wheat was relatively unimportant in Swabia.

In the eighth through 11th century, in northern France, the most important crops were (in approximate order) rye (Secale cereale), bread wheat, barley, and oats (Avena sativa). Barley and oats were the most important crops in Normandy and Brittany. Rye is more winter-hardy and tolerant of poor soils than wheat, and thus became the dominant crop on many marginal and northernmost European sites. Another hardy crop, bere, a kind of barley, was grown in Scandinavia and England and especially in marginal agricultural areas in Scotland.

In the lowlands of the Netherlands and adjacent France, soil influenced the crops planted. On sandy soils, in a three-field system, wheat was nearly absent as a crop with rye planted as a winter crop and oats and barley being the principal spring-planted crops. On more fertile loess and loamy soils, wheat, including spelt, became much more important replacing rye in many areas. Other crops included pulses (beans and peas) and fruits and vegetables. Farmers of loess and loamy soils planted a wider variety of crops than those on sandy soils.

In Wiltshire in England in the 13th and 14th centuries, wheat, barley, and oats were the three most common crops, with varying percentages of each on different manors. Legumes were planted on up to 8 percent of the common fields. In addition to the grain crops in the common fields of the open-field system, farmer's houses usually had a small garden (croft) near their house in which they grew vegetables such as cabbages, onions, peas and beans; an apple, cherry or pear tree; and raised a pig or two and a flock of geese.

== Livestock ==
Livestock was more important in northern Europe than in the Mediterranean area where dry weather in summer reduced the fodder available for animals. Near the Mediterranean, sheep and goats were the most important farm animals and transhumance (seasonal movement of livestock) was common. In northern Europe cattle, pigs, and horses were also important. Mediterranean soils were lighter than those commonly found in northern Europe, thus reducing the need of Mediterranean farmers for oxen and horses as draft animals. Cattle, especially oxen, were vital in northern Europe as draft animals. Plow teams, ideally comprising eight oxen, were necessary to plow the heavy soils. Few farmers were wealthy enough to own a full team and thus plowing required cooperation and sharing of draft animals among farmers. Horses in Roman times were owned mostly by the wealthy but they were increasingly used as draft animals to replace oxen after about 1000 AD. Oxen were cheaper to own and maintain, but horses were faster. Pigs were the most important animals raised for meat in medieval England and other parts of northern Europe. Pigs were prolific and required little care. Sheep produced wool, skin (for parchment), meat, and milk, though less valuable in the marketplace than pigs.

== Productivity ==
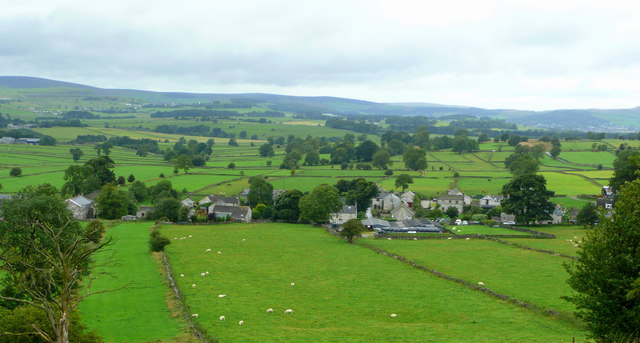
A modern-day landscape preserving a scene similar to that of a medieval village surrounded by open fields. Each of the large fields was divided into long, narrow strips of land cultivated by different farmers.

Crop yields in the Middle Ages were extremely low compared to those of the 21st century, although probably not inferior to those in much of the Roman Empire preceding the Middle Ages and the early modern period following the Middle Ages. The most common means of calculating yield was the number of seeds harvested compared to the number of seeds planted. On several manors in Sussex England, for example, the average yield for the years 1350–1399 was 4.34 seeds produced for each seed sown for wheat, 4.01 for barley, and 2.87 for oats. (By contrast, wheat production in the 21st century can total 30 to 40 seeds harvested for each seed sown.) Average yields of grain crops in England from 1250 to 1450 were 7 to 15 bushels per acre (470 to 1000 kg per ha). Poor years, however, might see yields drop to less than 4 bushels per acre. Yields in the 21st century, by contrast, can range upwards to 60 bushels per acre. The yields in England were probably typical for Europe in the Middle Ages.

Scholars have often criticized medieval agriculture for its inefficiency and low productivity. The inertia of an established system was blamed. "Everyone was forced to conform to village norms of cropping, harvesting, and building." Two reputed inefficiencies of the predominant open-field system were the communal management of land which resulted in less than optimal allocation of resources and the fact that farmers had small, scattered strips of land to cultivate which was wasting of time in traveling from one strip to another. Despite the reputed inefficiencies, the open-field system existed for roughly one thousand years over large parts of Europe and only disappeared slowly from 1500 to 1800. Moreover, the replacement of the open-field system by privately owned property was fiercely resisted by many elements of society. The "brave new world" of a harsher, more competitive and capitalistic society from the 16th century onward destroyed the securities and certainties of land tenure in the open-field system.

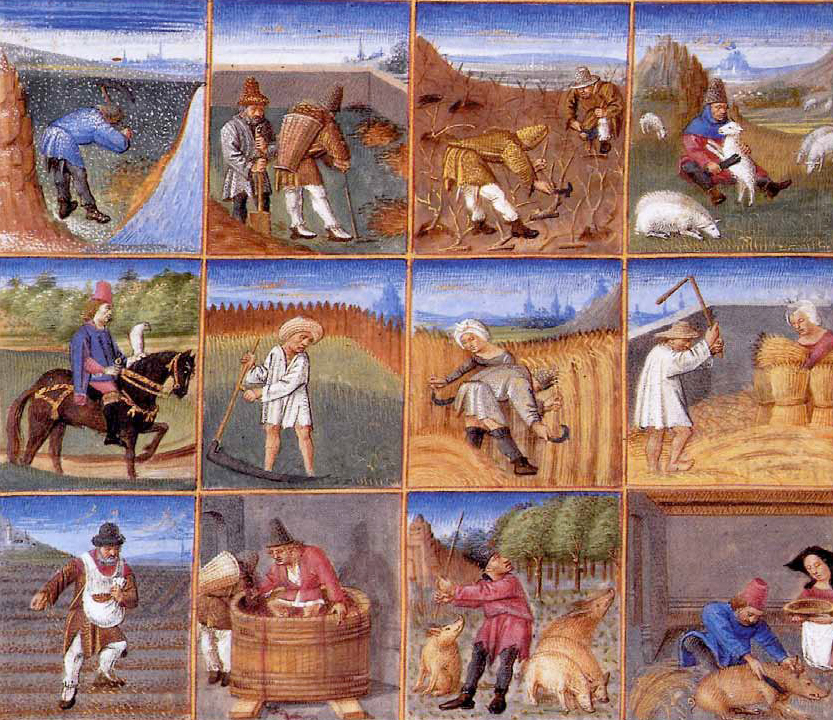
Agricultural calendar, c. 1470, from a manuscript of Pietro de Crescenzi

The "Postan Thesis" is also cited as a factor in the low productivity of medieval agriculture. Productivity suffered because of inadequate fertilization to keep the land productive. This was due to a shortage of pasture for farm animals and, thus, a shortage of nitrogen-rich manure to fertilize the arable land. Moreover, because of population growth after the 9th century, marginal lands, pasture, and woodlands were converted into arable lands which further reduced the number of farm animals and the quantity of manure.

The earliest evidence of progress in increasing productivity comes in the 14th and 15th centuries from the Low Countries of the Netherlands and Belgium, and Flanders in northern France. The agricultural practices there involved the near elimination of fallow land by planting cover crops such as vetch, beans, turnips, spurry, and broom and high-value crops such as rapeseed, madder and hops. As opposed to the extensive agriculture of medieval times, this new technique involved intensive cultivation of small plots of land. Techniques of intensive cultivation quickly spread to Norfolk in England, agriculturally-speaking the most advanced area of England. These advancements aside, it was the 17th century before England saw widespread increases in agricultural productivity in what was called the British Agricultural Revolution.

The low level of medieval yields persisted in Russia and some other areas until the 19th century. In 1850, the average yield for grain in Russia was 600 kilograms per hectare (about 9 bushels per acre), less than one half the yield in England and the Low Countries at that time.

== Famines ==
Famines caused by crop failures and poor crop years were an ever present danger in medieval Europe. It was often not possible to relieve a famine in one area by importing grain from another area as the difficulty of overland transportation caused the price of grain to double for each 50 miles it was transported.

One study concluded that famines in Europe occurred on an average every 20 years between the years 750 and 950. The principal causes were extreme weather and climatic anomalies which reduced agriculture production. Warfare was not found to be a major cause of famine. A study of crop failures in Winchester, England from 1232 to 1349 found that harvest failure occurred an average of every 12 years for wheat and every 8 years for barley and oats. Localized famine may have occurred in years in which one or more crops failed. Weather was again identified as the chief cause. Climatic change may have played a part as the Little Ice Age may have begun between 1275 and 1300 with a consequent shortening of the growing season.

Warfare was apparently responsible for a major famine in Hungary from 1243 to 1245. These were the years in the aftermath of the Mongol invasion and widespread destruction. Twenty to fifty percent of the population of Hungary is estimated to have died of hunger and war.

The best known and most extensive famine of the Middle Ages was the Great Famine of 1315–1317 (which actually persisted to 1322) that affected 30 million people in northern Europe, of whom five to ten percent died. The famine came near the end of three centuries of growth in population and prosperity. The causes were "severe winters and rainy springs, summers and falls." Yields of crops fell by one-third or one-fourth and draft animals died in large numbers. The Black Death of 1347–1352 was more lethal, but the Great Famine was the worst natural catastrophe of the later Middle Ages.

== Technological innovation ==
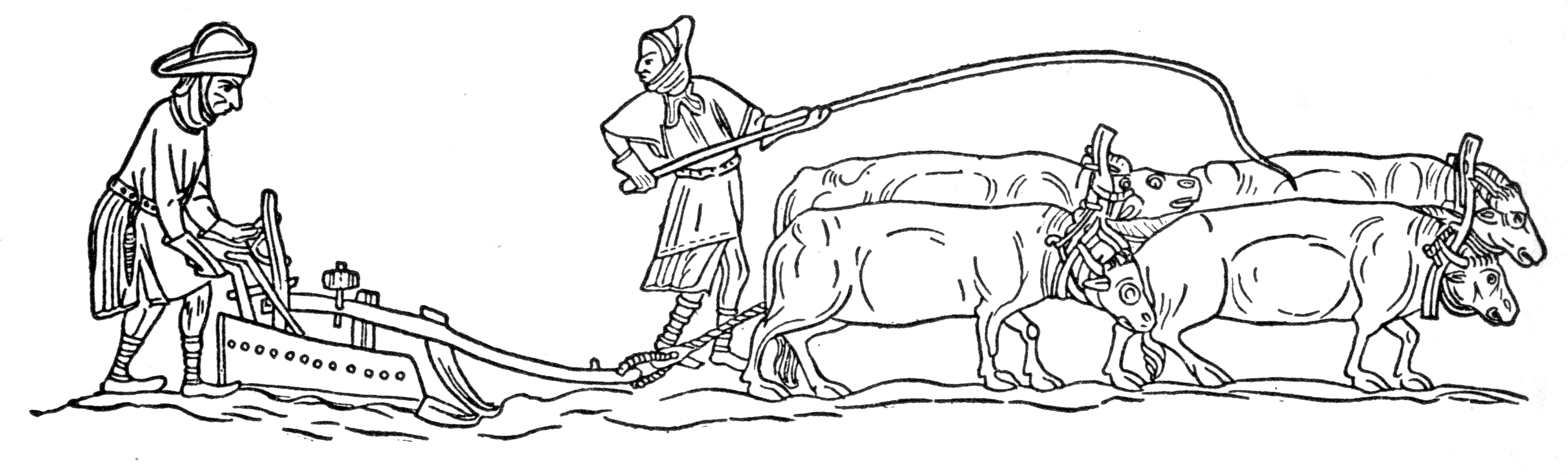
A medieval plow.

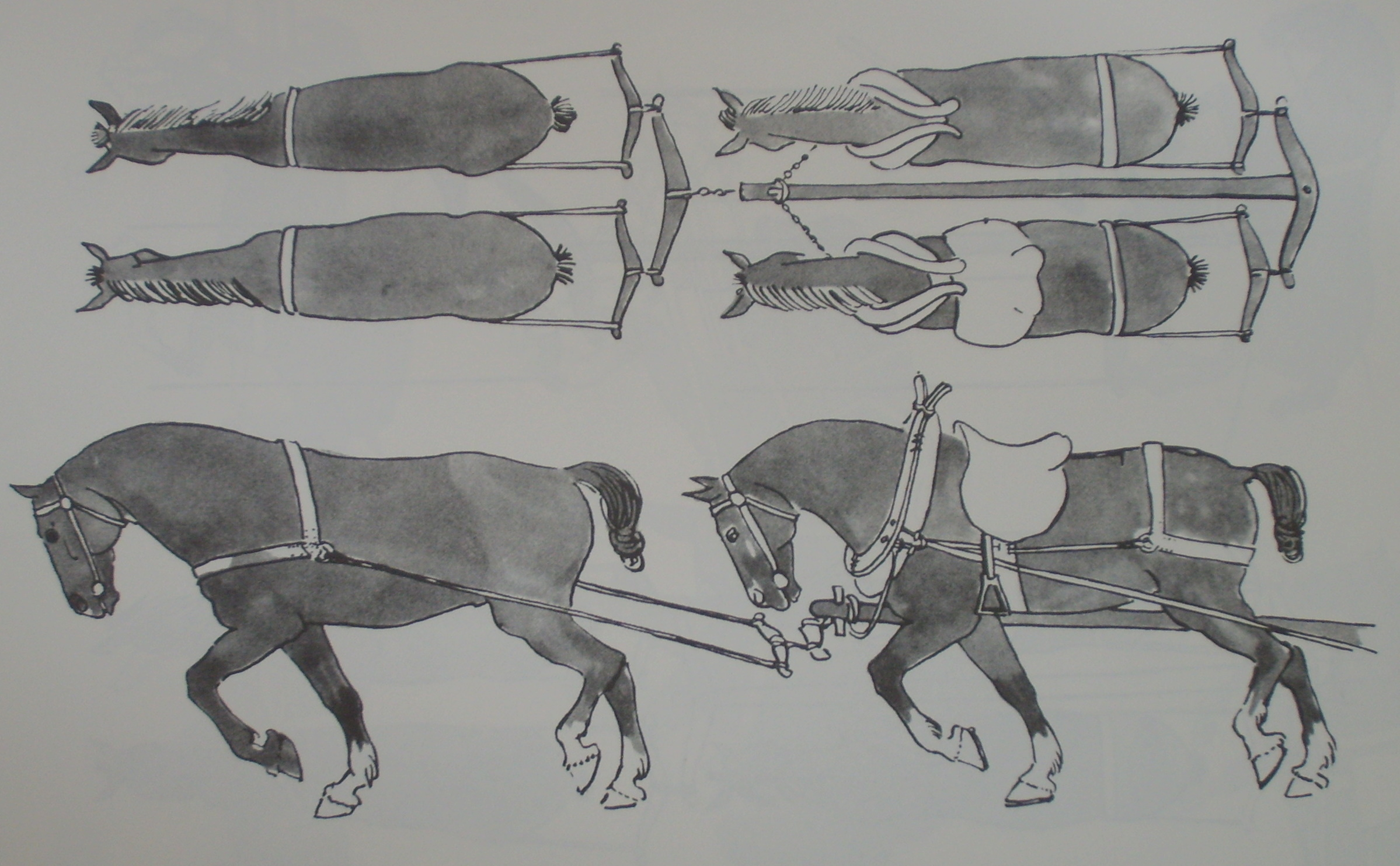
Plow horses. The lead horse has a breast collar; the rear horse wears a horsecollar.

The most important technical innovation for agriculture in the Middle Ages was the widespread adoption around 1000 of the mouldboard plow and its close relative, the heavy plow. These two plows enabled medieval farmers to exploit the fertile but heavy clay soils of northern Europe. In the Roman era and on light soils, the ard or scratch plow had sufficed. The mouldboard and heavy plows turned the soil over which facilitated the control of weeds and their incorporation into the soil, increasing fertility. Mouldboard plowing also produced the familiar ridge and furrow pattern of medieval fields which facilitated drainage of excess moisture. "By allowing for better field drainage, access [to] the most fertile soils, and saving of peasant labor time, the heavy plow stimulated food production and, as a consequence 'population growth, specialization of function, urbanization, and the growth of leisure.'"

Two additional advances coming into general use in Europe around 1000 were the horse collar and the horseshoe. The horse collar increased the pulling capacity of a horse. The horseshoe protected a horse's hooves. These advances resulted in the horse becoming an alternative to slow-moving oxen as a draft animal and for transportation.

These technological innovations and the additional agricultural production they stimulated resulted in Europe experiencing a large increase in population from 1000 (or earlier) to 1300, an increase that was reversed by the Great Famine and the Black Death of the 14th century.
