= Carruca =

Type of heavy plow used in Northern European medieval agriculture

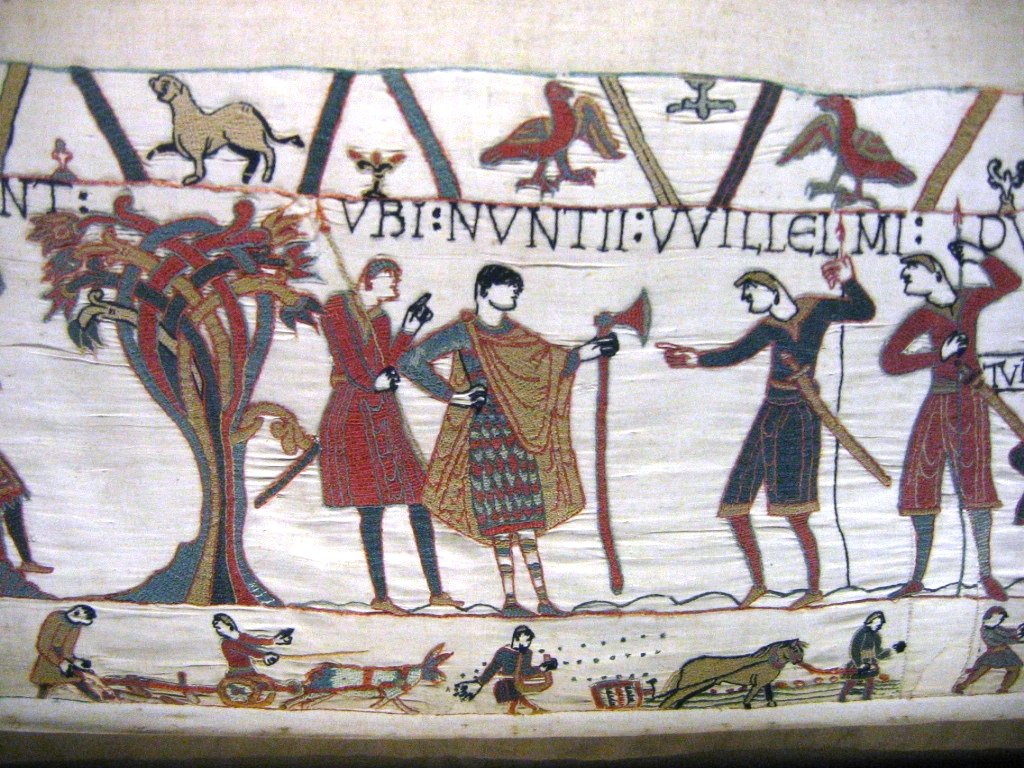
The Bayeux Tapestry, a medieval embroidered cloth depicting the conquest of England in 1066 AD, plus ploughing in the bottom panel

The carruca or caruca was a kind of heavy plow important to medieval agriculture in Northern Europe. The carruca used a heavy iron plowshare to turn heavy soil and may have required a team of eight oxen. The carruca also bore a coulter and moldboard. It gave its name to the English term carucate — the amount of land a carruca team could till in a season.

This article will go over: When the carruca was adopted by certain regions, why the invention was important, and how it affected the danish region in particular.

== Arrival of the heavy plow ==
Based on linguistic evidence, the carruca may have been employed by some Slavs by AD 568. It was present in Italy's Po Valley by 643 and—judging from the terminology in the Lex Alemannorum—in southwestern Germany by 720.

The carruca may have been introduced to the British Isles by the Viking invasions of England in the late 9th century.

== The importance of the heavy plow ==
The scratch plow, which preceded the wheeled plow, had been ideal for the light sandy soils of Southern Europe, and continued use in various places. The carruca could turn over a furrow and it gave an opportunity to utilize the heavier clay soils of Northern Europe that the scratch plow didn't work on. It also provided greater drainage to the soil which was very important in the thick clay soils of Northern Europe.

It was a very important invention because unlike the scratch plow it dug deep into the soil and fully excavated any weeds, the scratch plow however couldn't reach deep enough to disrupt the root systems, the carruca was more than strong enough to do so. Since it fully turned the soil over it also allowed for the burying of animal manure to be used as fertalizer which helped replinish the nutrients in the soil.

Its use required cooperation among peasants because few would own enough oxen to pull it. The scratch plow tended to create square fields because the field had to be plowed twice, the second time at right angles to the first. By contrast, the carruca, through actually flipping the dirt over, acomplished more in one plow than the scratch plow could in two. This resulted in the carruca being most efficient in oblong paddocks. That was because turning a team of eight oxen was a slow and arduous endeavor so farmers worked in long strips to maximize straight line plowing. Because this pattern conflicted with traditional ownership arrangements, the carruca was probably most often used when breaking uncultivated ground.

It is important to mention that the carruca did not make the scratch plow irrelevant as when the carruca was used on the lighter sandy soils of the Mediterranean it would slowly destroy said soils over time. Because of this it's use continued in places like the Mediterranean or Southern Europe.

== The wheeled plough in the Danish region ==
The well-known Viking settlement of Danelagen (English: Danelaw) testify to the enduring presence of Scandinavians on the British Isles from the 9th century onwards and the idea of Viking settlers introducing the wheeled plough may well be one of the possible congruencies of history. Hoffs evaluation (Hoff 2006) of the Danish landscape laws take in many aspects. In the section "The cultivated land", subsection "Agricultural systems" (German: Der bewirtschaftete Boden, Anbausysteme) Hoff draws up lines of agricultural development stemming a period of circa 1000 years (2nd - 12th century)—regions mentioned include Denmark, the Netherlands, North-West Germany and England. The earliest reliable date for the wheeled plough in the Danish region is from the 11th century, at the location Sønder Vium. Hoff commented that "These sporadic ploughmarks give no information on the structure and function of the agricultural system." In the same section ("Agricultural systems") Hoff gathers textual evidence from the Danish landscape laws that indicate usage of the wheeled plough, but also a terminological uncertainty that is later resolved - i.e. reflecting a time of transition. The period of transition is not exactly determined by Hoff, but the period 12th-14th century may be suggested.

== See also ==
- History of the plow
- Carucate

== Literature ==
- Hoff, Anette (2006), Recht und Landschaft, Ergänzungsbände zum Reallexikon der Germanischen Altertumskunde, vol. 54, Berlin, New York: Walter de Gruyter, ISBN 9783110190373
- Western Civilization Sixth Edition by Jackson J. Spielvogel
- Fontana Economic History of Europe - The Middle Ages, ed C Cipolla, article by L White
