= Aratrum =

Arātrum is the Latin word for ard, and arotron (ἄροτρον) is the Greek word. The Greeks appear to have had several kinds of ard from the records. Hesiod advised the farmer to always have two ards handy, so that if one broke the other could replace it. These ards should be of two kinds. The first was the body- or crook-ard, called autoguos (αυτογυος, "self-limbed"), in which the stilt (Gk echetle; Lat stiva) was of the same piece of timber as the ard-head (Gk elyma; Lat dentale) and the draft-beam (Gk histoboeus; Lat buris). The second was the sole-ard, called pekton (πηκτον, "fixed"), because in it three parts (stilt + sole (Gk gyes) + beam), which were of three kinds of timber, were adjusted to one another and fastened together by nails.

The autoguos crook-ard was made from a sapling with two branches growing from its trunk in opposite directions. In ploughing, the trunk served as the draft-beam, one of the two branches stood upwards and became the stilt, and the other scratched the ground and, sometimes shod with bronze or iron, acted as the share (Gk hynis; L vomer).

== Sources ==
Based on an article from A Dictionary of Greek and Roman Antiquities, John Murray, London, 1875. ἄρατρον
