= Ard (plough) =

Simple light plough without a mouldboard

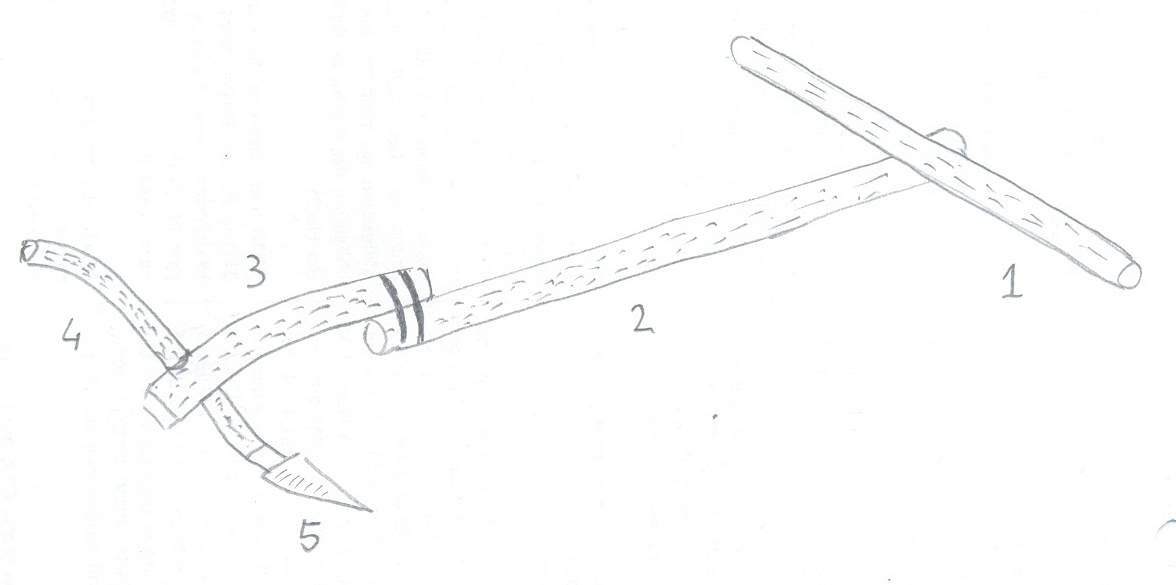
Single-handled bow ard: (1) yoke, (2) draft-pole, (3) draft-beam, (4) stilt, (5) share

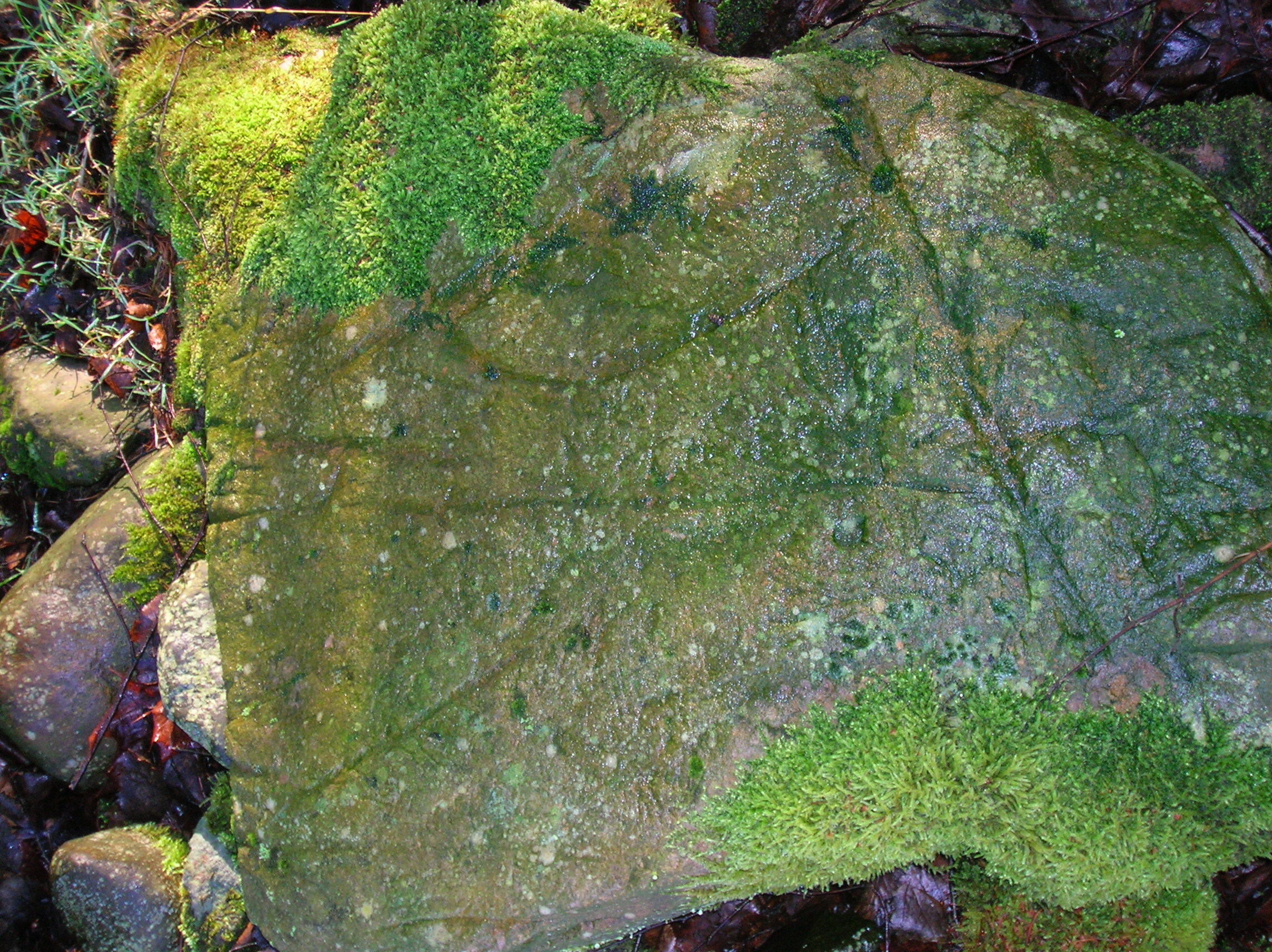
Score marks (ard marks) from a rip ard on a boulder in a clearance cairn.

The ard, ard plough, or scratch plough is a simple light plough without a mouldboard. It is symmetrical on either side of its line of draft and is fitted with a symmetrical share that traces a shallow furrow but does not invert the soil. It began to be replaced in China by the heavy carruca turnplough in the 1st century, and in most of Europe from the 7th century.

In its simplest form it resembles a hoe, consisting of a draft-pole (either composite or a single piece) pierced with a nearly vertical, wooden, spiked head (or stock) which is dragged through the soil by draft animals and very rarely by people. The ard-head is at one end a stilt (handle) for steering and at the other a share (cutting blade) which gouges the surface ground. More sophisticated models have a composite pole, where the section attached to the head is called the draft-beam, and the share may be made of stone or iron. Some have a cross-bar for handles or two separate stilts for handles (two-handled ard). The share comes in two basic forms: a socket share slipped over the nose of the ard-head; and the tang share fitted into a groove where it is held with a clamp on the wooden head. Additionally, a slender protruding chisel (foreshare) can be fitted over the top of the mainshare.

== Use ==
Rather than cutting and turning the soil to produce ridged furrows, the ard breaks up a narrow strip of soil and cuts a shallow furrow (or drill), leaving intervening strips undisturbed. The ard is not suited for clearing new land, so grass and undergrowth are usually removed with hoes or mattocks. Cross-ploughing, where the soil is tilled a second time at right angles to the first, is often necessary to break the soil up better. This usually results in square or diamond-shaped fields and is effective at clearing annual weeds. The ard's shallow furrows are ideal for most cereals, and if the seed is sown broadcast, the ard can be used to cover the seed in rows. In fact, the ard may have been invented in the Near East to cover seed rather than till. That would explain why in Mesopotamia seed drills were used together with ards. The ard is most useful on light soils such as loams or sands, or in mountain fields where the soil is thin, and can be safely used in areas where deep ploughing would turn up hardpan or would cause salination or erosion.

Ards may be drawn by oxen, water buffalo, donkeys, camels, or other animals.

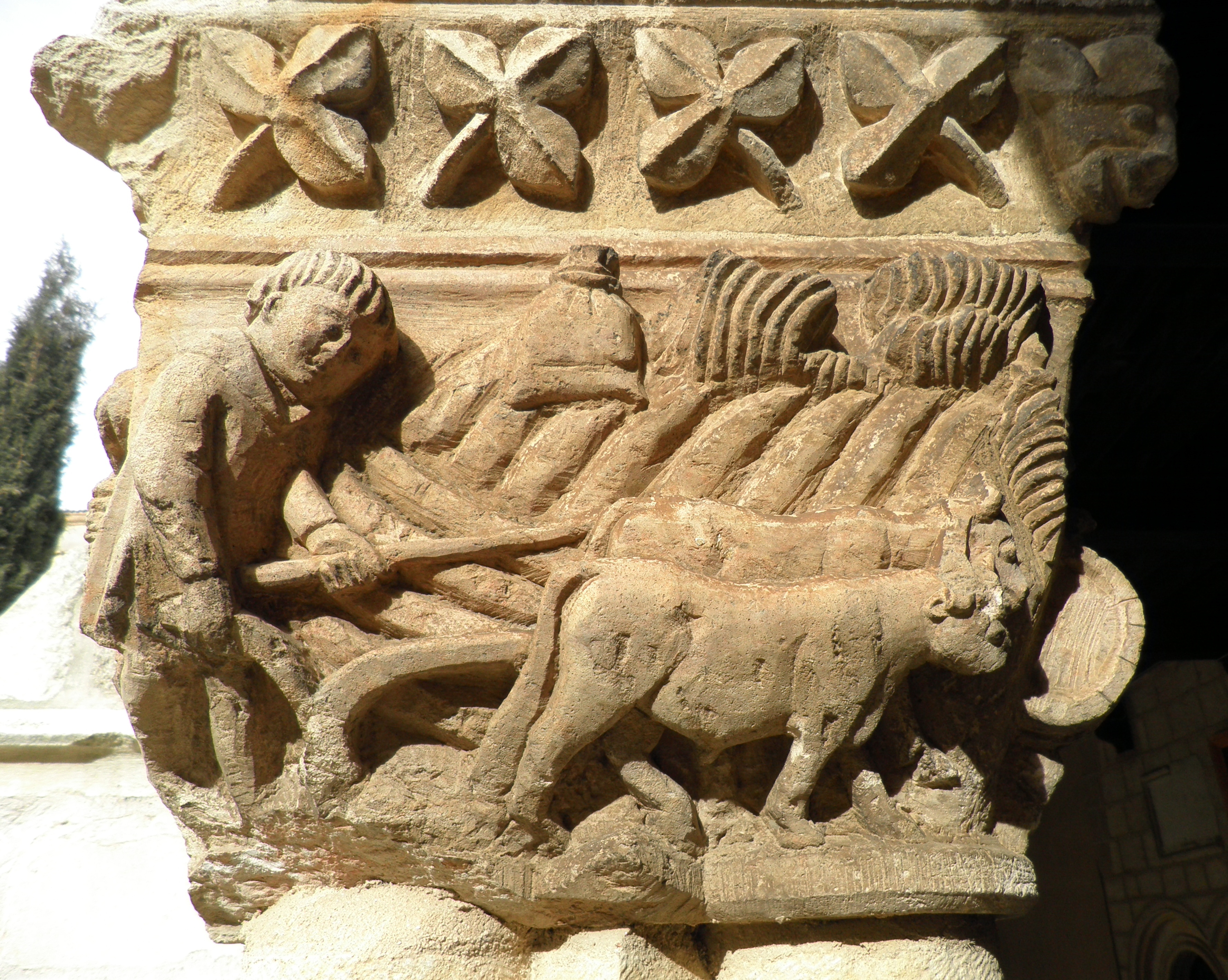
Church of Santa María la Real de Nieva, Segovia province, Spain.

== Types ==
Ards come in a number of varieties. Based on use, there are two kinds: the tilth ard, for cutting furrows in cleared land, and the rip ard, or sod buster, which has a hooked share that gouges deeper into the soil and more effectively clears virgin or fallow land. The two were in early times used in conjunction with each other. Third is the seed drill ard, used specifically in Mesopotamia, which added a funnel for dropping seed in the furrows as the ard cut them.

Basic ard types: 1 - bow ard 2 - body ard 3 - sole ard

The earliest and most basic tilth ards are the two-piece models:

- bow ard (or beam ard), made of a bow-shaped draft-pole (or beam) originally pierced by a spear-like head (stilt & share), later developing a composite body with a separate head and stilt inserted in the pole;
- body ard, where the draft-pole is inserted into the thicker upward-inclined head which tapers into a handle.

The bow ard is the weaker, narrower, and probably earlier of the two. It is used for shallow tillage, normally with a tang share, in dry, stony soils. It is restricted mainly to the Mediterranean (Spain, Tunisia, Greece, Turkey, Syria, Lebanon), Ethiopia, Iran, and eastern India and Sumatra. The more widespread body ard, sturdier and heavier for deeper tillage (in soils with enough moisture), usually has a socket share which is sometimes laterally extended or has serrated wings (Balkans, Morocco, Portugal, Spain) for better mixing of soil and cutting of weeds. It had a short portion of the body which was first made to slide on the furrow bottom and gradually developed into a horizontal body. The body ard dominates in Portugal, western Spain, the Balkans, India, Sri Lanka, Malaysia, Thailand, Japan, and most of Latin America.

The bow ard favored the development of a long horizontal sole body (slade) sliding on the ground. This led to the sole ard, first attested in Bronze Age Cyprus, being single-handled and consisting of a flat sole (or slade) into which were set the draft-pole and stilt, meaning there were three separate pieces. Their use in Ancient Greek agriculture was described by Hesiod. In northern Europe the single-handled crook ard was favored, consisting of a stilt inserted into a pole with a crook-shaft, i.e., the pole had a curved shape and had a natural crook tip that served as a share.

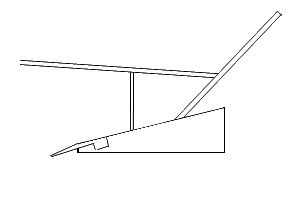
Quadrangular ard

Later variations of the sole ard come in two types: the triangular and quadrangular ards. The triangular ard has a horizontal sole body holding the beam and stilt which cross each other, forming a triangle at the base. The quadrangular ard has a horizontal sole body connected to a straight, nearly parallel beam by a stilt and a brace.

== History ==
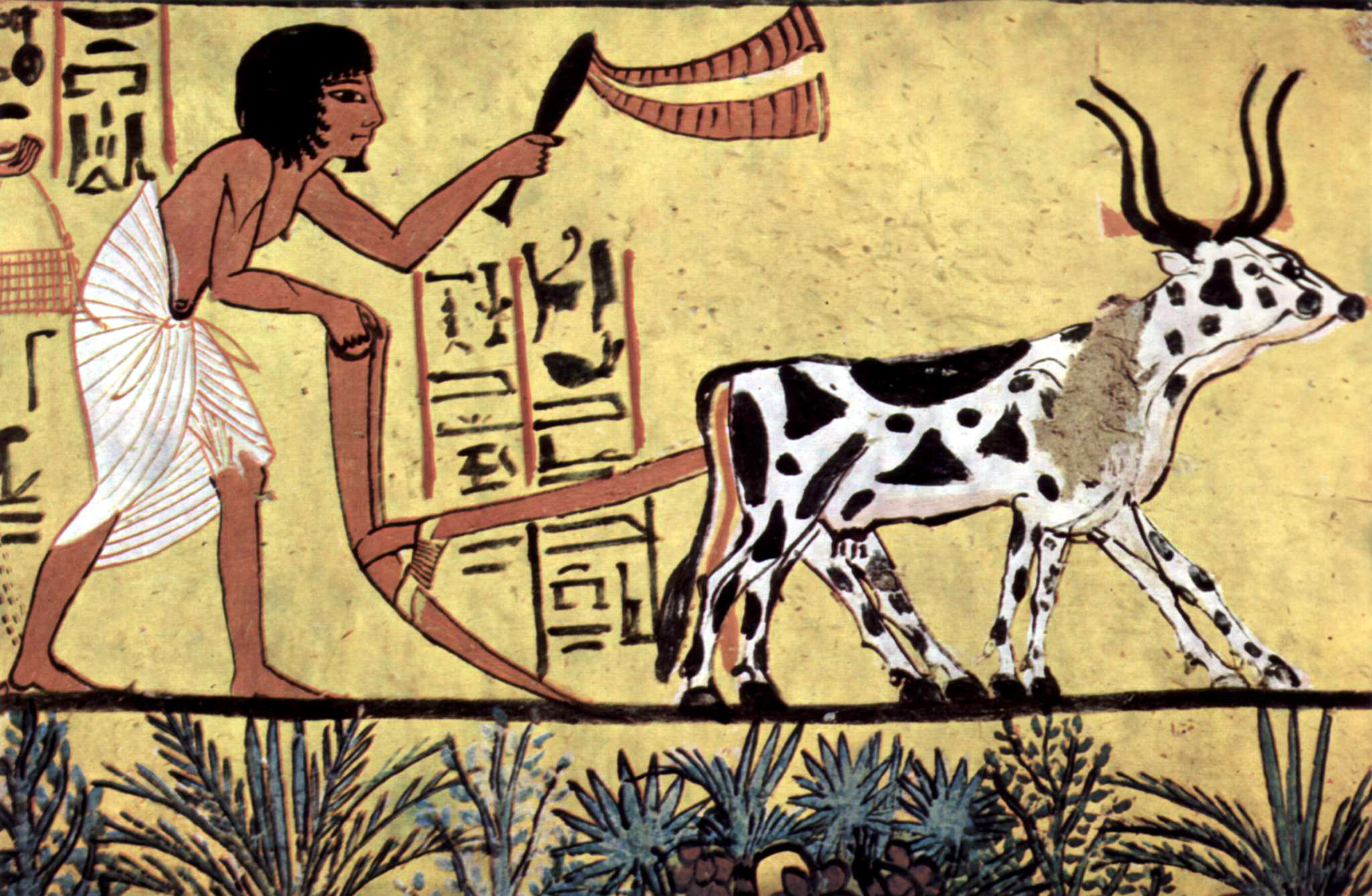
Egyptian ard, heb, with braces, c. 1300 BC.

Single-handled ox-drawn ard; Bronze Age rock carving, Bohuslän, Sweden.

Evidence of its use in prehistory is sometimes found at archaeological sites where the long, shallow scratches (ard marks) it makes can be seen cutting into the subsoil. The ard first appears in the mid-Neolithic and is closely related to the domestication of cattle. It probably spread with animal traction in general across the cereal-growing cultures of the Neolithic Old World. Its exact point of origin is unknown, but it spread quickly throughout West Asia, South Asia and Europe in the late Neolithic and early Chalcolithic.

Evidence appears in the Near East in the 6th millennium BC. Iron versions appeared c. 2300 BC both in Assyria and 3rd-dynasty Egypt. In Europe, the earliest known wooden ard (at Lavagone in Italy) dates from around 2300–2000 BC, but the earliest scratch marks date from 3500–3000 BC. All of these were bow ards, also depicted in the rock drawings of Bohuslän, Sweden, Copper Age stelae of Valcamonica (3000–2200 BC) and Fontanalba, France.

The first bow ards were likely adapted from hoes and like instruments and therefore suffered from poor balance due to their narrow bodies with only one point in the soil. This restricted their use to obstacle-free soils such as along irrigated canals. The stress between body and pole was neutralized by adding a brace consisting of a fibre or leather strap between the low end of the pole and the body. The brace was later made out of wood and became important, not only on bow ards but also body ards. Today, a wooden brace between the draft-pole and upper stilt is a particular feature of body ards in Syria, central Iraq, Turkestan, and Gansu (China). The bow ard arrived in China as early as 3000 BC, possibly along with wheat, barley, and hemp during the Lungshanoid period. Today, the bow ard is confined to minority tribes and mountainous regions, but in earlier times was widely disseminated until ousted by the carruca turnplough beginning around AD 100.

The body ard made its way east as far as northwest China via Xinjiang, but then underwent radical changes. A long-pole body ard with a knee-like brace is still found in some parts of China. In some parts of Europe with moist soils, the body ard's path was cleared by a ristle, a coulter-like implement used to reach greater depth. In Spain and Portugal this remains a separate tool, but elsewhere it was the precursor to the coulter.

== Gallery ==
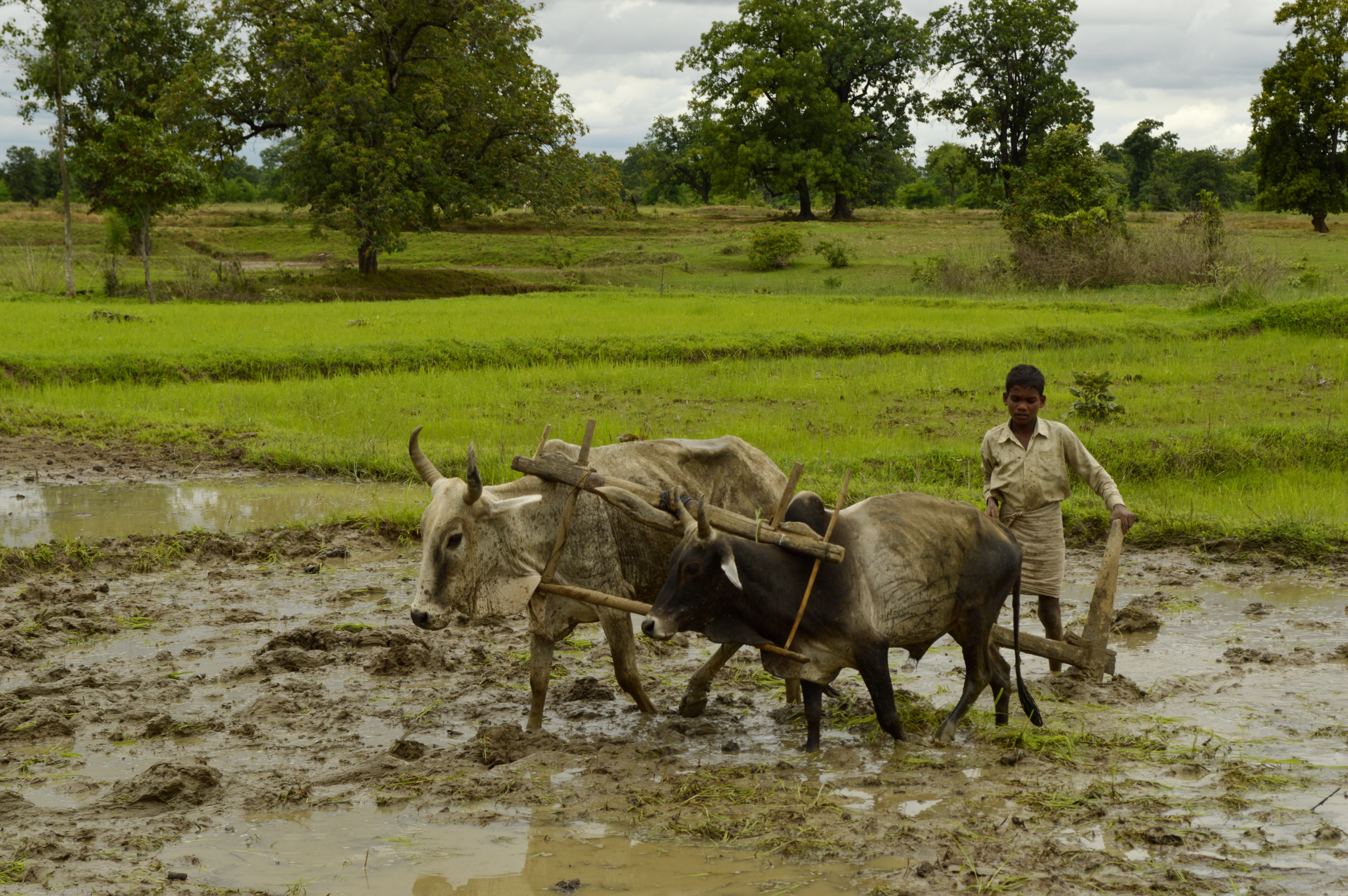
Ploughing of paddy field with an ard pulled by oxen

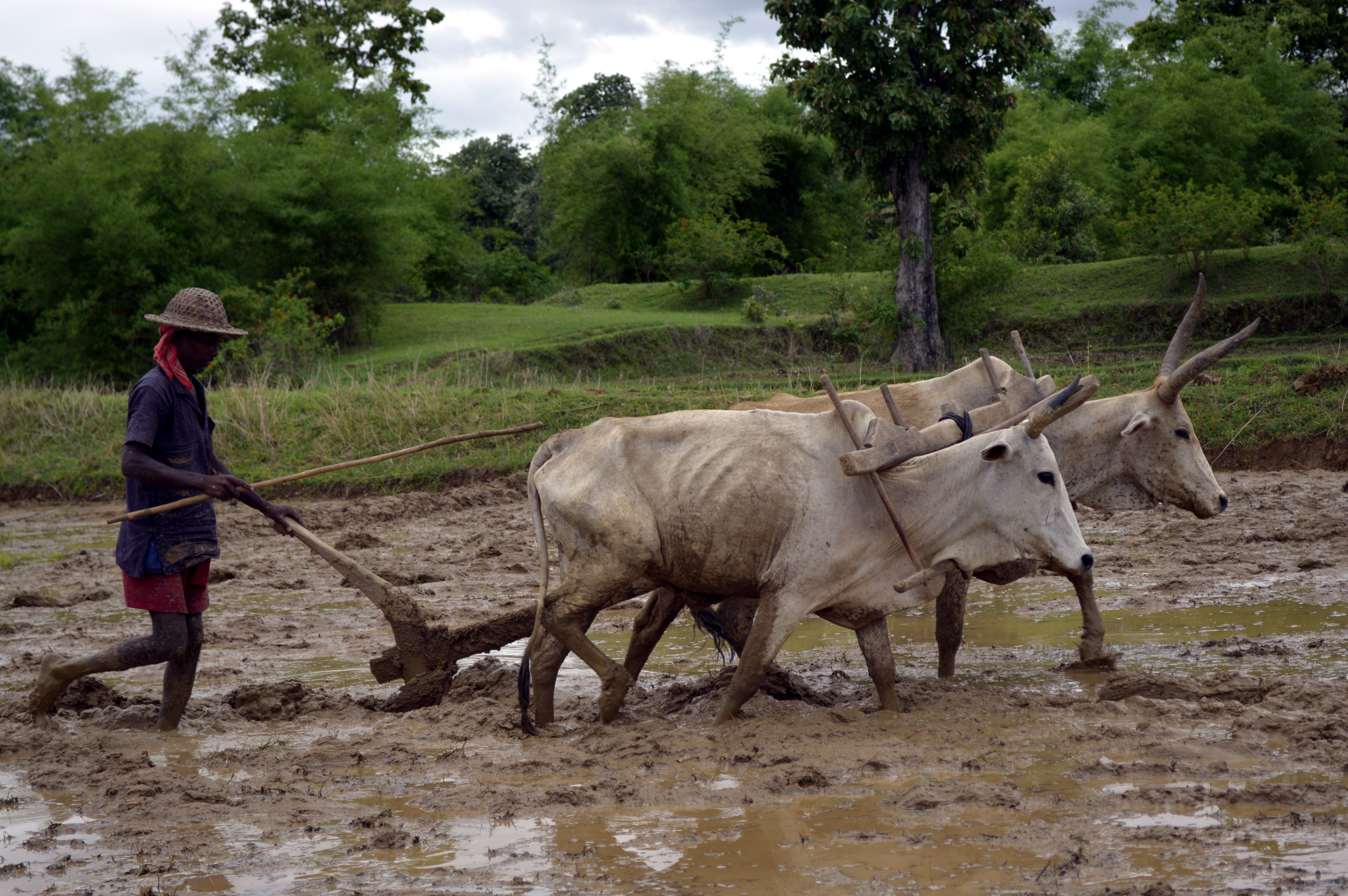
Ploughing of paddy field with an ard pulled by oxen

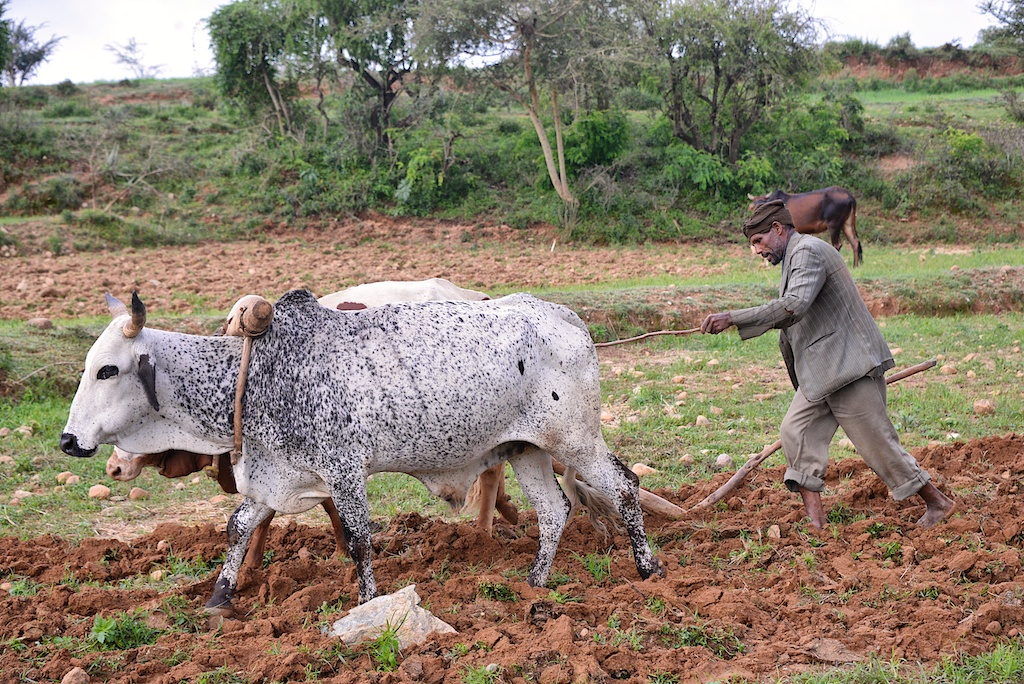
Ploughing in Tigray, Ethiopia

== See also ==
- Aratrum - ard discussed in ancient Roman literature
- Clearance cairn – stones with ard marks
- Chisel plow, a modern type of non-moldboard, non-turnover plow
