= List of ancient physicians =

The following is a list of ancient physicians who were known to have practised, contributed, or theorised about medicine in some form between the 30th century BCE and 4th century CE.

== 30th century to 1st century BCE ==
Name	Century	Ethnicity	Known for
Imhotep	27th century BCE	Egyptian	One of the first recorded physicians
Bogar	3rd century BCE	Indian	The Pharmacognosy is the best known of his treatises
Tirumular	2nd century BCE	Indian	
Aegimus	5th century BCE	Greek	first person who wrote a treatise on the pulse
Korakkar	2nd century BCE	Indian	His works include Korakkar Malai Vagatam (Korakkar's Mountain Medicines)
Patanjali	2nd century BCE	Indian	Founder of Yoga School
Amenhotep	13th century BCE	Egyptian	chief physician of the early 19th Dynasty
Androcydes	4th century BCE	Greek	
Antipater	1st century BCE	Greek	author of a work titled On the Soul
Kashyapa	8th century BCE	Indian	wrote Kashyap Samhita
Apollonius Glaucus	3rd century BCE	Greek	On Internal Diseases
Apollonios of Kition	1st century BCE	Greek Cypriot	most important work is On Joints
Agnivesha	8th century BCE	Indian	wrote Agnivesha Samhita considered foundational text of the Agnivesha school of early Ayurveda
Bharadwaja	12th century BCE	Indian	He stated that embryo is caused from union of man's sperm and menstrual blood of woman
Atreya	6th century BCE	Indian	Instructor of the compiler of the Bhela Samhita
Aristotle	4th century BCE	Greek	
Asclepiades of Bithynia	2nd–1st century BCE	Greek	built a new theory of disease
Bian Que	4th century BCE	Chinese	earliest known Chinese physician
Bolus of Mendes	3rd century BCE	Greek	
Cato the Elder	2nd century BCE	Roman	
Charaka	6th–2nd century BCE	Indian	one of the principal contributors to Ayurveda
Ctesias	5th century BCE	Greek	
Demetrius of Apamea	2nd century BCE	Greek	studied sexual organs
Dexippus of Cos	4th century BCE	Greek	pupil of Hippocrates
Dieuches	4th century BCE	Greek	Dogmatic school of medicine
Diocles of Carystus	4th century BCE	Greek	practical medicine, especially diet and nutrition
Erasistratus	3rd century BCE	Greek	founded a school of anatomy in Alexandria
Heraclides of Tarentum	2nd century BCE	Greek	physician of the Empiric school
Herophilus	3rd century BCE	Greek	deemed to be the first anatomist
Hicesius	1st century BCE	Greek	head of a medical school established at Smyrna
Hippocrates	5th century BCE	Greek	"Father of Medicine", wrote the Hippocratic Corpus
Irynachet	22nd century BCE	Egyptian	senior physician of the great house
Jivaka Komarabhacca	5th century BCE	Indian	personal physician of King Bimbisara and Gautama Buddha
Madhava-kara	8th century BCE	Indian	listed diseases along with their causes, symptoms, and complications
Meges of Sidon	1st century BCE	Greek/Roman	surgeon
Mnesitheus	4th century BCE	Greek	classification of diseases
Sextius Niger	1st century BCE	Roman	pharmacology
Penthu	16th century BCE	Egyptian	Chief Physician to Akhenaten
Peseshet	25th century BCE	Egyptian	one of the earliest known female physicians
Harita	8th century BCE	Indian	pupil of Atreya and composed samhita
Jatukarna	8th century BCE	Indian	pupil of Atreya and composed "Jatukarna Samhita"
Philinus of Cos	3rd century BCE	Greek	reputed founder of the Empiric school
Philistion of Locri	4th century BCE	Greek	physician and writer of medicine
Philoxenus (physician)	3rd century BCE	Greco-Egyptian	wrote several volumes on surgery
Plistonicus	4th–3rd century BCE	Greek	wrote a work on anatomy
Posidonius	2nd–1st century BCE	Greek	polymath
Praxagoras of Cos	4th century BCE	Greek	theory of circulation
Qar	23rd century BCE	Egyptian	Chief Physician during the Sixth dynasty
Rabâ-ša-Marduk	13th century BCE	Kassite	
Serapion of Alexandria	3rd century BCE	Greek	member of the Empiric school of medicine
Shepseskaf-ankh	25th century BCE	Egyptian	Chief Physician during the Fifth dynasty
Sushruta	7th century BCE	Indian	author of the treatise The Compendium of Suśruta
Themison of Laodicea	1st century BCE	Greek	founder of the Methodic school of medicine
Theophrastus	4th–3rd century BCE	Greek	

== 1st century to 4th century CE ==
Name	Century	Ethnicity	Known for
Abascantus	2nd century CE	Greek	invented antidote against serpent bites
Fabiola	4th century CE	Roman	First hospital in Latin Christendom was founded by Fabiola at Rome.
Ephrem the Syrian	4th century CE	Roman	Opened a hospital at Edessa They spread out and specialized nosocomia for the sick, brephotrophia for foundlings, orphanotrophia for orphans, ptochia for the poor, xenodochia for poor or infirm pilgrims, and gerontochia for the old
Basil of Caesarea	4th century CE	Roman	Founded at Caesarea in Cappadocia an institution (hospital) called Basileias, with several buildings for patients, nurses, physicians, workshops, and schools.
Aemilia Hilaria	4th century CE	Roman	female physician. Wrote books on gynecology and obstetrics.
Aeschrion of Pergamon	2nd century CE	Greek	pharmaceutist
Agathinus	1st century CE	Greek	founder of the Eclectic school of medicine
Albucius	1st century CE	Roman	wealthy physician, with annual income of 250,000 sesterces
Alcon (classical history)	1st century CE	Greek	surgeon
Andromachus	1st century CE	Greek	
Anonymus Londinensis	1st century CE	Greek	author of the physiological work On Medicine
Antipater	2nd century CE	Greek	gave an account of the morbid symptoms that precede death
Antiphanes of Delos	2nd century CE	Greek	"the sole cause of diseases in man was the too great variety of his food"
Antonius Castor	1st century CE	Roman	herbal remedies
Antyllus	2nd century CE	Greek	surgeon, treatment of aneurysms became standard until the 19th century
Apollonius Claudius	2nd century CE	Greek	
Apollonius Cyprius	1st century CE	Greek	
Apollonius Organicus	2nd century CE	Greek	
Apollonius Pergamenus	3rd century CE	Greek	
Apollonius Pitaneus	1st century CE	Greek	
Apollonius Senior	1st century CE	Greek	
Apollonius Tarensis	1st century CE	Greek	
Apollonius Ther	1st century CE	Greek	
Dridhabala	2nd century CE	India	edited the Charaka Samhita
Archigenes	1st–2nd century CE	Greek	very high reputation for his professional skill
Arcyon	1st century CE	Greek	surgeon
Aretaeus	1st century CE	Greek	general treatise on diseases
Asclepiades Pharmacion	1st–2nd century CE	Greek	skill and knowledge of pharmacy
Aspasia the Physician	4th century CE	Greek	Female gynecologist
Athenaeus of Attalia	1st century CE	Greek	founder of the Pneumatic school of medicine
Cassius Felix	3rd century CE	Roman African	medical writer
Aulus Cornelius Celsus	1st century CE	Roman	De Medicina
Charmis	1st–2nd century CE	Greek	Physician active in Rome
Saints Cosmas and Damian	3rd century CE	Arab	persecuted by Diocletian
Crinas	1st–2nd century CE	Greek	Physician active in Rome
Criton of Heraclea	1st–2nd century CE	Greek	Chief physician of emperor Trajan
Damocrates	1st century CE	Greek	wrote pharmaceutical works in Greek iambic verse
Demosthenes Philalethes	1st century CE	Greek	author of the Ophthalmicus, the most influential work of ophthalmology in antiquity
Saint Diomedes	3rd century CE	Greek	arrested by Diocletian
Pedanius Dioscorides	1st century CE	Greek	De Materia Medica
Dong Feng	3rd century CE	Chinese	
Erotianus	1st century CE	Greek	Collection of Hippocratic Words
Eudemus (physician)	1st–2nd century CE	Greek	two persons, the first the poisoner of Drusus Julius Caesar, the second an acquaintance of Galen
Saint Fabiola	4th century CE	Roman	nurse
Gaius Stertinius Xenophon	1st century CE	Greek	personal physician of emperor Claudius
Galen	2nd–3rd century CE	Greek	developer of anatomy, physiology, pathology, pharmacology, and neurology
Ge Hong	4th century CE	Chinese	originator of First Aid in TCM
Heliodorus	1st century CE	Greek	wrote on medical technique
Herodotus (physician)	1st–2nd century CE	Greek	Two doctors, the first a Pneumaticist, the second an Empiricist
Hua Tuo	2nd century CE	Chinese	abilities in acupuncture, moxibustion, herbal medicine and medical Daoyin exercises
Huangfu Mi	3rd century CE	Chinese	compiled the Canon of Acupuncture and Moxibustion
Ji Ben	3rd century CE	Chinese	physician who started a failed rebellion
Leonidas (physician)	2nd–3rd century CE	Greek	surgical writer, provided the first detailed description of a mastectomy
Leoparda	4th century CE	Greek	female gynecologist
Marcellus of Side	2nd century CE	Greek	wrote a long medical poem
Quintus Gargilius Martialis	3rd century CE	Roman	writer on horticulture, botany and medicine
Menemachus	2nd century CE	Greek	Methodic school of medicine
Menodotus of Nicomedia	2nd century CE	Greek	Empiricist
Metrodora	4th century CE	Greek	female gynecologist, author of On the Diseases and Cures of Women.
Oribasius	4th century CE	Greek	medical writer and person physician of Julian the Apostate
Paccius Antiochus	1st century CE	Roman	wealthy commercial physician
Philagrius of Epirus	3rd century CE	Greek	medical writers
Philonides (physician)	1st century CE	Greek	author of De Medicina
Philumenus	3rd century CE	Greek	
Aelius Promotus	2nd century CE	Greek	author of Medicinalium Formularum Collectio
Rufus of Ephesus	1st–2nd century CE	Greek	wrote treatises on dietetics, pathology, anatomy, and patient care
Serenus Sammonicus	3rd century CE	Roman	author of a didactic medical poem Liber Medicinalis
Scribonius Largus	1st century CE	Roman	court physician to the Roman emperor Claudius
Sextius Niger	1st century CE	Roman	author of the pharmacologist work On material
Sextus Empiricus	2nd century CE	Roman	
Sextus Placitus	4th century CE	Roman	author of Libri medicinae Sexti Placiti Papyriensis ex animalibus pecoribus et bestiis vel avibus Concordantiae
Soranus of Ephesus	2nd century CE	Greek	author of treatise on gynecology and On Acute and Chronic Diseases
Theodorus Priscianus	4th century CE	Roman	author of Medical Matters in Four Books
Vagbhata	4th century CE	Indian	He is considered to be "The Trinity" of Ayurvedic knowledge
Thessalus of Tralles	1st century CE	Roman	Methodic school of medicine, court physician of Emperor Nero
Xenocrates of Aphrodisias	1st century CE	Greek	pharmaceutical writer, including On Useful Things from Living Beings
Zhang Zhongjing	2nd-3rd century CE	Chinese	made great contributions to the development of Traditional Chinese Medicine
Zopyrus (physician)	1st century CE	Greek	antidote inventor

== Unknown Date ==
Name	Century	Ethnicity	Known for
Olymnius of Alexandria	Unknown	Greek	author of the work on Critical Days.
