= Antipater (disambiguation) =

Several notable persons of the ancient world were named Antipater, Antipatros (from Greek: Αντιπάτερ, Αντίπατρος, literally meaning "like the father"):

== Hellenistic leaders ==
- Antipater (c. 397–319 BC), Macedonian general
- Antipater I of Macedon, king of Macedon from 297 to 294 BC
- Antipater Etesias (died 279 BC), king of Macedon
- Antipater of Derbe

=== Herodians ===
- Antipater the Idumaean (died 43 BC), father of Herod the Great
- Antipater (son of Herod the Great) (46–4 BC), son of Herod the Great
- Antipater, son of Salome, Herod the Great's sister
- Antipater, son of Salampsio, Herod the Great's daughter, and Phasael ben Phasael

== Philosophers ==
- Antipater of Cyrene (c. 4th century BC), philosopher of the Cyrenaic school
- Antipater of Tarsus (died 130 BC), Stoic philosopher
- Antipater of Tyre (died 45 BC), Stoic philosopher

== Writers ==
- Antipater (writer), wrote on the subject of dreams
- Antipater of Acanthus, Greek grammarian of uncertain date
- Antipater of Bostra, bishop of Bostra in Arabia, fl. 460. His chief work was Antirrhesis, a reply to Pamphilus's Apology for Origen
- Antipater of Sidon (2nd century BC), best known for his list of the Seven Wonders of the World
- Antipater of Thessalonica (1st century BC), poet
- Antipater (1st century BC physician)
- Antipater (2nd century physician)
- Antipater (astrologer), who wrote a work upon genethialogia
- Aelius Antipater, writer and governor (Severan era)
- Lucius Coelius Antipater, annalist, 2nd century BC

== Others ==
- Antipater of Phlya, leading Athenian statesman under Augustus
- Antipater son of Epigonus, Greek Prince from Asia Minor who was the son of Epigonos of Telmessos
- Antipater, celebrated silver-chaser (Naturalis Historia, xxxiii. 55)

== See also ==
- The modern surname Antipa(s) comes from Antipater. See:
  - Antipas (disambiguation)
  - Stella Antipa, Greek actress
