= Aelia gens =

Ancient Roman family

The gens Aelia, occasionally written Ailia, was a plebeian family in Rome, which flourished from the fifth century BC until at least the third century AD, a period of nearly eight hundred years. The archaic spelling Ailia is found on coins, but must not be confused with Allia, which is a distinct gens. The first member of the family to obtain the consulship was Publius Aelius Paetus in 337 BC.

Under the empire the Aelian name became still more celebrated. It was the name of the emperor Hadrian, and consequently of the Antonines, whom he adopted. A number of landmarks built by Hadrian also bear the name Aelius. The Pons Aelius is a bridge in Rome, now known as the Ponte Sant'Angelo. Pons Aelius also refers to a Roman settlement in Britannia Inferior, now the site of Newcastle upon Tyne, while Aelia Capitolina was a Roman colony built on the ruins of Jerusalem.

On the coins of Aelia in 224 BC, the 'H' may stand for Hatria or Herdonia.

== Praenomina ==
The Aelii regularly used the praenomina Publius, Sextus, Quintus, and Lucius. There is also one example of Gaius amongst the early members of the gens.

== Branches and cognomina ==
The family-names and surnames of the Aelia gens are Catus, Gallus, Gracilis, Lamia, Ligur, Paetus, Staienus, Stilo, and Tubero. The only cognomina found on coins are Bala, Lamia, Paetus, and Sejanus. Of Bala nothing is known. Sejanus is the name of the favorite of the emperor Tiberius, who was adopted by one of the Aelii.

== Members ==
This list includes abbreviated praenomina. For an explanation of this practice, see filiation.

=== Aelii Paeti ===
- Publius Aelius, one of the first plebeian quaestors, in 409 BC.
- Publius Aelius Paetus, consul in 337 BC, and one of the first plebeian augurs in 300 BC.
- Lucius Aelius Paetus, plebeian aedile in 296 BC.
- Gaius Aelius Paetus, consul in 286 BC.
- Quintus Aelius Paetus, a pontifex who fell in the Battle of Cannae, 216 BC. He had been a candidate for the consulship that year.
- Publius Aelius Q. f. Paetus, a well-known jurist, consul in 201 BC.
- Sextus Aelius Q. f. Paetus Catus, an eminent jurist, consul in 198 BC.
- Quintus Aelius P. f. Q. n. Paetus, praetor in 170 BC, and consul in 167.
- Publius Aelius Paetus, triumvir monetalis in 138 BC.

=== Aelii Tuberones ===
- Publius Aelius Tubero, praetor in 201 and 177 BC.
- Quintus Aelius Tubero, tribune of the plebs in 194 BC, proposed the establishment of colonies among the Bruttii and Thurii, and appointed a commissioner for the foundation of the latter colony.
- Quintus Aelius Tubero, served under his father-in-law, Lucius Aemilius Paullus, in the war against Perseus in 168 BC.
- Quintus Aelius Q. f. Tubero, a jurist, praetor in 123 and consul suffectus in 118 BC.
- Lucius Aelius Tubero, a friend and relation of Cicero.
- Quintus Aelius L. f. Tubero, a jurist, and perhaps the same man as the consul of 11 BC.

=== Aelii Lamiae ===
- Lucius Aelius Lamia, a man of equestrian rank, who assisted Cicero in the suppression of the second Catilinarian conspiracy. He was banished for his efforts in 58 BC, but was subsequently recalled. He supported Caesar during the Civil War, and served as aedile in 45. He was praetor elect for 43 BC, but died in unusual and tragic circumstances. (Note: Dictionary of Greek and Roman Biography and Mythology, vol. II, p. 714 ("Lamia", no. 1): "This Lamia seems to be the same as the L. Lamia, praetorius vir, who is said to have been placed upon the funeral pile as if dead, and then to have recovered his senses, and to have spoken after the fire was lighted, when it was too late to save him from death.")
- Lucius Aelius L. f. Lamia, a friend of Horace, was consul in AD 3. He was appointed governor of Syria by Tiberius, but never permitted to administer his province. He succeeded Lucius Calpurnius Piso Caesoninus as praefectus urbi on the latter's death in AD 32, but died the following year, and received a censor's funeral.
- Lucius Aelius Lamia Plautius Aelianus, consul suffectus in AD 80, during the reign of Titus. He married Domitia Longina, the daughter of Gnaeus Domitius Corbulo, but Domitian made her his mistress, and later married her, having Lamia put to death.

=== Aelii Marullini et Hadriani ===
- Publius Aelius Marullinus, great-great-great-grandfather of the emperor Hadrian, became the first senator in the family, when he was admitted to the senate by Octavian during the Second Triumvirate.
- Publius Aelius P. f. Marullinus, the great-great-grandfather of Hadrian.
- Publius Aelius P. f. P. n. Marullinus, the great-grandfather of Hadrian.
- Publius Aelius P. f. P. n. Hadrianus Marullinus, a senator, and the grandfather of Hadrian.
- Aelius P. f. P. n. Hadrianus, the brother of Marullinus, according to the Historia Augusta he was an astrologer who prophesied that his grandnephew Hadrian would one day become emperor.
- Publius Aelius P. f. P. n. Hadrianus Afer, a senator, and the father of Hadrian.
- Aelia P. f. P. n., presumed aunt of Hadrian, and the mother of Lucius Dasumius Hadrianus.
- Publius Aelius P. f. P. n. Hadrianus, emperor from AD 117 to 138.
- Aelia P. f. P. n. Domitia Paulina, the sister of Hadrian.
- Lucius Aelius Caesar, adopted by Hadrian, was consul in AD 137.
- Titus Aelius Hadrianus Antoninus Pius, adopted by Hadrian, was emperor from AD 138 to 161.
- Marcus Aelius Aurelius Verus Caesar, usually known as "Marcus Aurelius", was adopted by Antoninus Pius, and emperor from AD 161 to 180.
- Lucius Aelius Aurelius Commodus, better known as "Lucius Verus", was adopted by Antoninus Pius, and emperor with Marcus Aurelius from AD 161 to 169.
- Lucius Aelius Aurelius Commodus, the son of Marcus Aurelius, was emperor from AD 176 to 192.

=== Others ===
- Aelia, the second wife of Sulla.
- Publius Aelius Ligus, consul in 172 BC.
- Lucius Aelius Stilo Praeconinus, a grammarian, and teacher of both Varro and Cicero.
- Aelius Ligus, tribune of the plebs in 58 BC, opposed the recall of Cicero, according to whom, he had assumed a surname to which he had no right.
- Aelius Promotus, a physician at Alexandria, perhaps during the first century BC.
- Gaius Aelius Gallus, governor of Egypt under Augustus.
- Sextus Aelius Catus, consul in AD 4, the father-in-law of Claudius.
- Aelia Paetina, the second wife of Claudius.
- Aelius Theon, a first-century sophist.
- Aelius Catus, a commander, possibly the same as Sextus Aelius Catus.
- Lucius Aelius Sejanus, praetorian prefect under the emperor Tiberius, obtained much of the authority of the Roman state, but was suddenly stripped of his powers and honours, and put to death during his consulship in AD 31.
- Lucius Aelius Magnus, appointed duumvir at Pompeii by order of Nero, after helping to rebuild the city following an earthquake. A love letter to his wife, Plotilla, is attested in an inscription on a building now dubbed the "Casa di Plotilla".
- Lucius Aelius Oculatus, consul suffectus from May to June in AD 73.
- Aelius Aristides, a second-century orator.
- Publius Aelius Fortunatus, a second-century painter.
- Publius Aelius Justus, a decurion of the municipium of Bistua Nova in Dalmatia, buried in a second-century tomb at the site of modern Brca in Montenegro, along with his wife, Aelia Procula.
- Aelia Procula, buried at the site of modern Brca, along with her husband, Publius Aelius Justus.
- Aelius Dionysius, a Greek rhetorician during the reign of Hadrian.
- Aelius Marcianus, a jurist of the early third century.
- Marcus Aelius Aurelius Theo, governor of Arabia Petraea between 253 and 259.
- Aelius Spartianus, ostensibly a historian, and one of the authors of the Historia Augusta. The lives of several emperors from Hadrian to Caracalla are attributed to him.
- Aelius Donatus, a fourth-century grammarian and teacher of rhetoric.

== See also ==
- List of Roman gentes

== Bibliography ==
- Marcus Tullius Cicero, De Domo Sua, De Haruspicum Responsis, Epistulae ad Atticum, Epistulae ad Familiares, In Pisonem, Post Reditum in Senatu, Pro Scauro, Pro Sestio.
- Quintus Horatius Flaccus (Horace), Carmen Saeculare.
- Titus Livius (Livy), History of Rome.
- Valerius Maximus, Factorum ac Dictorum Memorabilium (Memorable Facts and Sayings).
- Gaius Plinius Secundus (Pliny the Elder), Historia Naturalis (Natural History).
- Decimus Junius Juvenalis, Satirae (Satires).
- Publius Cornelius Tacitus, Annales.
- Gaius Suetonius Tranquillus, De Vita Caesarum (Lives of the Caesars, or The Twelve Caesars).
- Lucius Cassius Dio Cocceianus (Cassius Dio), Roman History.
- Dictionary of Greek and Roman Biography and Mythology, William Smith, ed., Little, Brown and Company, Boston (1849).
- Theodor Mommsen et alii, Corpus Inscriptionum Latinarum (The Body of Latin Inscriptions, abbreviated CIL), Berlin-Brandenburgische Akademie der Wissenschaften (1853–present).
- Hermann Dessau, Inscriptiones Latinae Selectae (Select Latin Inscriptions, abbreviated ILS), Berlin (1892–1916).
- The Numismatic Circular, (1895).
- T. Robert S. Broughton, The Magistrates of the Roman Republic, American Philological Association (1952–1986).
- Matteo Della Corte, Loves and Lovers in Ancient Pompeii: A Pompeian Erotic Anthology, E. di Mauro (1960).
- Jack Lindsay, The Writing on the Wall: An Account of Pompeii in Its Last Days, F. Muller (1960) ISBN 9789080056077.
- Michele D'Avino, The Women of Pompeii, Loffredo (1967).
- Michael Crawford, Roman Republican Coinage, Cambridge University Press (1974, 2001).
- Paul A. Gallivan, "The Fasti for A.D. 70–96", in Classical Quarterly, vol. 31, pp. 186–220 (1981).
- T.P. Wiseman, Roman Studies: Literary and Historical, F. Cairns (1987).
- Ronald Syme, Roman Papers, Clarendon Press, Oxford (1979) ISBN 9780198148852.
