= Phoenicia under Hellenistic rule =

The Persian Empire, including modern Lebanon, eventually fell to Alexander the Great, king of Macedonia. He attacked Asia Minor, defeated the Persian troops in 333 BC, and advanced toward the Lebanese coast. Initially the Phoenician cities made no attempt to resist, and they recognized his suzerainty. However, when Alexander tried to offer a sacrifice to Melqart, Tyre's god, the city resisted. Alexander besieged Tyre in retaliation in early 332 BC. After seven months of resistance, the city fell, and its people were sold into slavery (See Siege of Tyre (332 BC)). Despite his early death in 323 BC, Alexander's conquest of the eastern Mediterranean Basin left a Greek imprint on the area. The Phoenicians, being a cosmopolitan people amenable to outside influences, adopted aspects of Greek civilization with ease

== Argead Dynasty ==
The Argead Dynasty, also known as the Temenid Dynasty, came to control Phoenicia under the Conqueror Alexander the Great. The Argead Dynasty ruled Phoenicia until the death of Alexander in June 323 BCE. Known for his spreading of Greek culture, Alexander brought many elements of Hellenism with him during his reign over Phoenicia. Alexander's conquest of Phoenicia began during his attack on the Persian Empire. Emboldened by a victory over the Persian army at the Granicus River (334 BCE), Alexander went on to take the entirety of Asia Minor. To further cripple Persian forces, Alexander turned his attention towards coast cities, as taking control of them would deprive the Persians of naval bases. This brought Alexander into contact with the Phoenicians, as they were large contributors to the Persian navy. However, the Phoenicians desired freedom from Persian control, so many were quick to surrender to the armies of Macedonia, as Alexander has promised conquered cities freedom and self-determination should they surrender to him.

=== Conquest of Tyre ===
In 332 BCE, Alexander came into contact with the city of Tyre. Unlike other Phoenician cities, Tyre did not surrender control to Alexander. Upon reaching the city, envoys told they Macedonians that while they would not give up control of the city, they would submit to his demands. Alexander wished to make a sacrifice to the Greek god Heracles in the city's temple of Melqart, who is considered the Phoenician counterpart to Heracles, as his arrival coincided with a festival held to honor Heracles. The Tyrians, worried that the dedication to a Hellenistic god would both dishonor the god Melqart as well as signal a challenge to the sovereignty of the city, denied Alexander's request, offering him to make a sacrifice outside of the city. In an effort to maintain neutrality, the city of Tyre declared that they would not allow neither Macedonians nor Persians inside the city during the festival. Upset by the sudden denial, Alexander decided to besiege the city.

While Tyre's lack of hospitality was the direct cause, Alexander's decision to attack the city stemmed from many considerations. By allowing the city to remain independent, Alexander would not possess total control of the Mediterranean coast, thereby providing his newly conquered territories with a weak spot, should the Persians deploy naval vessels. Secondly, by leaving the city after being spurned, his reputation as a conqueror would come into question, as he would have been successfully repelled by a much smaller force. This instance could, in some instances, be enough to spark rebellions to his power in discontented areas. Finally, by taking Tyre, Alexander would have conquered the whole of Phoenicia, further proving his status as a conqueror and also completely cutting off the Persians from access to the Mediterranean sea while simultaneously depriving them of their largest contributor to their navy.

After a seven month siege which involved the building of a isthmus (see Siege of Tyre (332 BC)), the Macedonians captured the city. What followed was the slaughter of many Tyrian citizens, as some put up resistance from within the walls. Following the subjugation of Tyre, Alexander performed his sacrifice to Heracles within the city's temple of Melqart, signifying his total control over the city. With the Alexander taking Tyre, Phoenicia fell into the control of the Argead Dynasty.

=== Occupation ===
Following the establishment of control over Phoenicia, the Argead Dynasty began to spread Hellenism within the territory. This primarily took the form of various Greek rituals and festivals, which were practiced and held within cities like Tyre – 331, the year after the siege on Tyre, was a particularly notable year for festivities with various competitions being held within the city. These rituals served to further reinforced the Hellenistic culture on the Phoenicians by making typical Greek activities, such as dramatic contests, commonplace with in the territory.

Despite the reinforcement of Greek culture in cities like Tyre, there was no apparent effort to completely remake Phoenicia under the control of Alexander. Unlike other conquered territories, the main Phoenician cities were not renamed or refounded by their new Hellenistic leaders, and instead kept their traditional Phoenician names. The Greek language, while incorporated into the territory, never completely replaced the Phoenician language, and the two seemed to coexist within the society. On a similar note, many Phoenician religious traditions and cults were discovered to have survived the rule of the Argead Dynasty, as many of these cults began to incorporate elements of Greek cults, thereby blending the two cultures into one. This blend of Phoenician and Greek culture is also seen throughout the society at the time, such as the designs of coins – which featured both Phoenician and Greek inscriptions. Later on, these coins would depict both figures which originated from Phoenician mythology and those from Greek mythology, combined with Greek lettering. One instance of this was the depiction of the Greek hero Cadmus, who was known as a prince of Phoenicia, on various coins.

== The Seleucid and Ptolemaic Dynasty ==
After Alexander's death, his empire was divided among his Macedonian generals. The eastern part—Phoenicia, Asia Minor, northern Syria, and Mesopotamia fell to Seleucus I, founder of the Seleucid dynasty. The southern part of Syria and Egypt fell to Ptolemy I Soter, and the European part, including Macedonia, to Antigonus I. This settlement, however, failed to bring peace because Seleucus I and Ptolemy clashed repeatedly in the course of their ambitious efforts to share in Phoenician prosperity. A final victory of the Seleucids ended a forty-year period of conflict.

The last century of Seleucid rule was marked by disorder and dynastic struggles. These ended in 64 BC, when the Roman general Pompey added Syria and Lebanon to the Roman Empire.

== Hellenistic writers from Seleucid and Roman Phoenicia ==
- Antipater of Sidon, poet
- Boethus of Sidon, Stoic philosopher
- Zeno of Sidon, philosopher
- Boethus of Sidon, philosopher
- Dorotheus of Sidon, astrologer
- Meges of Sidon, physician
- Porphyry of Tyre, philosopher
- Maximus of Tyre, rhetorician
- Marinus of Tyre, geographer
