= Agathinus =

1st-century Greek physician

Agathinus (Ancient Greek: Ἀγαθῖνος) was an eminent ancient Greek physician, the founder of a new medical sect, to which he gave the name of Episynthetici.

Agathinus was born at Sparta and must have lived in the 1st century AD, as he was the pupil of Athenaeus, and the tutor of Archigenes. He is said to have been once seized with an attack of delirium, brought on by want of sleep, from which he was delivered by his pupil Archigenes, who ordered his head to be fomented with a great quantity of warm oil.

Agathinus is frequently quoted by Galen, who mentions him among the Pneumatici. None of his writings are now extant. The precise opinions of his sect are not known, but they were probably nearly the same as those of the Eclectici
