= Pneumovesicoscopy =

Medical intervention

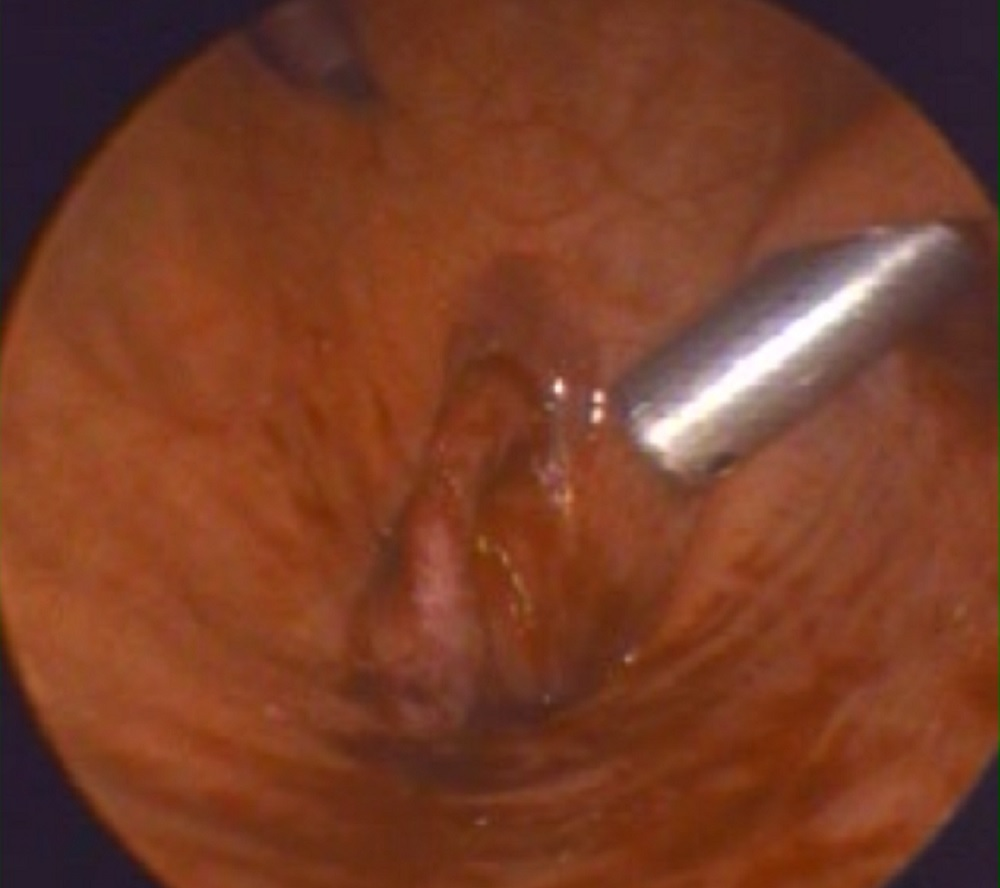
- Pneumovesicoscopic Ureteric Re-implantation

Occupation
- Names: Pneumovesicoscopy
- Occupation type: Specialty
- Activity sectors: Medicine, Surgery, Urology

Description
- Competencies: surgery of urinary tract
- Education required: Doctor of Medicine
- Fields of employment: Hospitals, Clinics

Pneumovesicoscopy (from Ancient Greek πνεῦμα (pneuma), meaning "air", Latin Vesica, meaning "bladder" and Ancient Greek σκοπέω (skopeo), meaning "to see") is a minimally invasive surgery procedure increasingly gaining traction in urologic surgery, especially for children. The procedure involves insertion of a 5mm (or 3mm) optical port into the dome of a saline-distended urinary bladder under cystoscopy guidance. The cystoscope is then withdrawn, the saline drained and bladder insufflated with carbon dioxide at 8–10 cm H_{2}O to create the working space. Two lateral 5(or 3)mm operative ports are then inserted under visual guidance for performance of surgery.

In recent years pneumovesicoscopy has been used for problems ranging from ureteric re-implantation, to removal of bladder stones, bladder diverticula and foreign bodies in the urinary bladder.
