= Leoparda =

Leoparda (4th century, Byzantium) was a purported gynecologist who served in the court of Gratian (359–383).

Information about Leoparda is said to come from a book by Emperor Gratian’s physician Theodorus Priscianus that he wrote for the purpose of educating women doctors. He allegedly notes that Leoparda was a respected gynecologist, but that her remedies were no more scientific than those of the Greek Dioscorides. The book is stated to contain quotations from Soranus, Cleopatra, and Aspasia. He is said to have dedicated the book to Leoparda and two other women physicians, Salvina and Victoria.

However, there is no reference to Leoparda or any of the other cited women in Theodorus Priscianus's sole surviving work, the Euporiston. Book III, which details gynaecology in ten chapters, only mentions Victoria, and it seems this is most likely a reference to the Roman goddess of victory.
