= Antiphanes =

Antiphanes may refer to:

- Antiphanes (comic poet) of Athens 4th century BC (408–334 BC)
- Antiphanes of Berge Athenian writer 4th century BC
- Antiphanes of Argos sculptor
- Antiphanes sculptor of Erechtheum
- Antiphanes of Delos physician
- Antiphanes of Macedon, epigrammatic poet
- Antiphanes of Megalopolis, epigrammatic poet
- Antiphanes (grasshopper), a genus of grasshoppers in the tribe Ommatolampidini
