= Pseudo-Apuleius =

Author of a 4th-century herbal

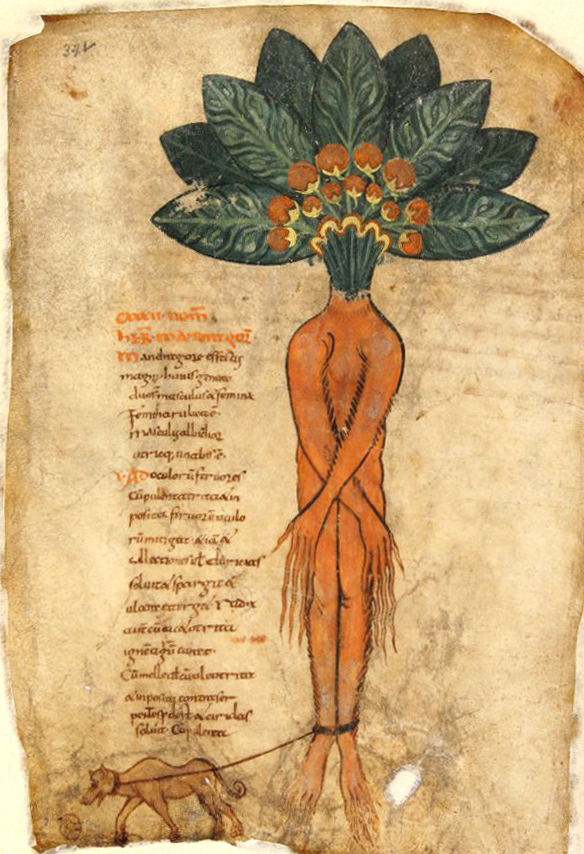
Manuscript Kassel; 9th century, Mandragora

Pseudo-Apuleius is the name given in modern scholarship to the author of a 4th-century herbal known as Pseudo-Apuleius Herbarius or Herbarium Apuleii Platonici. "Pseudo-Apuleius" is also used as a shorthand generic term to refer to the manuscripts and derived works.

The author of the text apparently wished readers to think that it was by Apuleius of Madaura (124–170 CE), the Roman poet and philosopher, but modern scholars do not believe this attribution. Little or nothing else is known of Pseudo-Apuleius.

The oldest surviving manuscript of the Herbarium is the 6th-century Leiden, MS. Voss. Q.9. Until the 12th century it was the most influential herbal in Europe, with numerous extant copies surviving into the modern era, along with several copies of an Old English translation. Thereafter, it was more or less displaced by the Circa instans, a herbal produced at the school of Salerno.

== Pseudo-Apuleius Herbarius ==
=== Illustrations ===
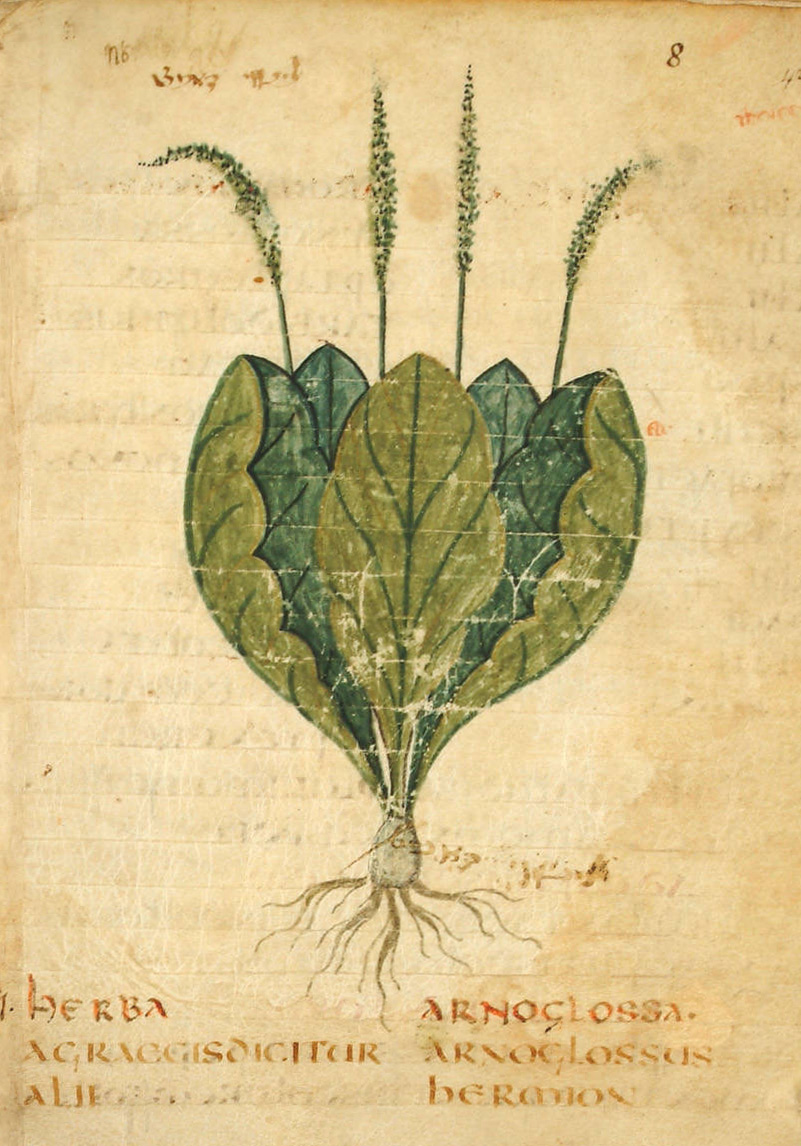
Manuscr. Leiden 6th cent Arnoglossa, Plantago

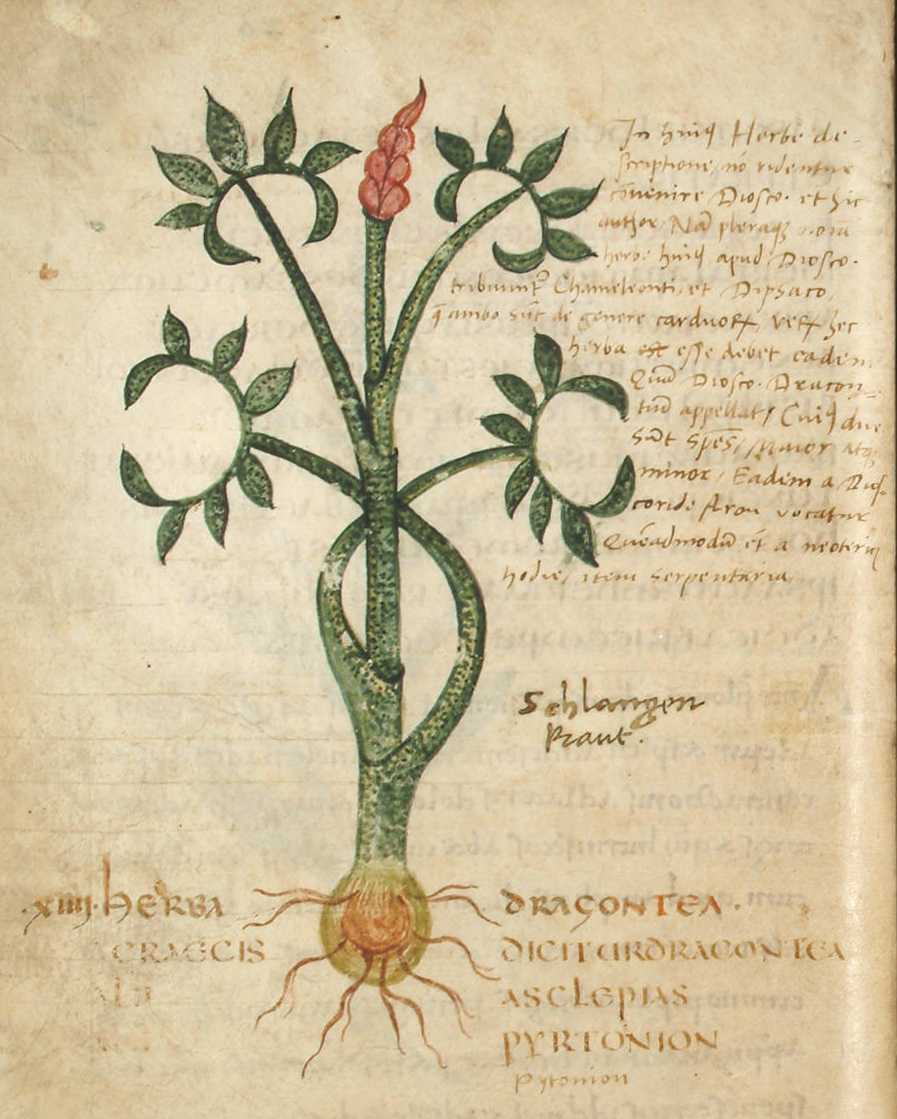
Manuscr. Leiden 6th cent Dragontea

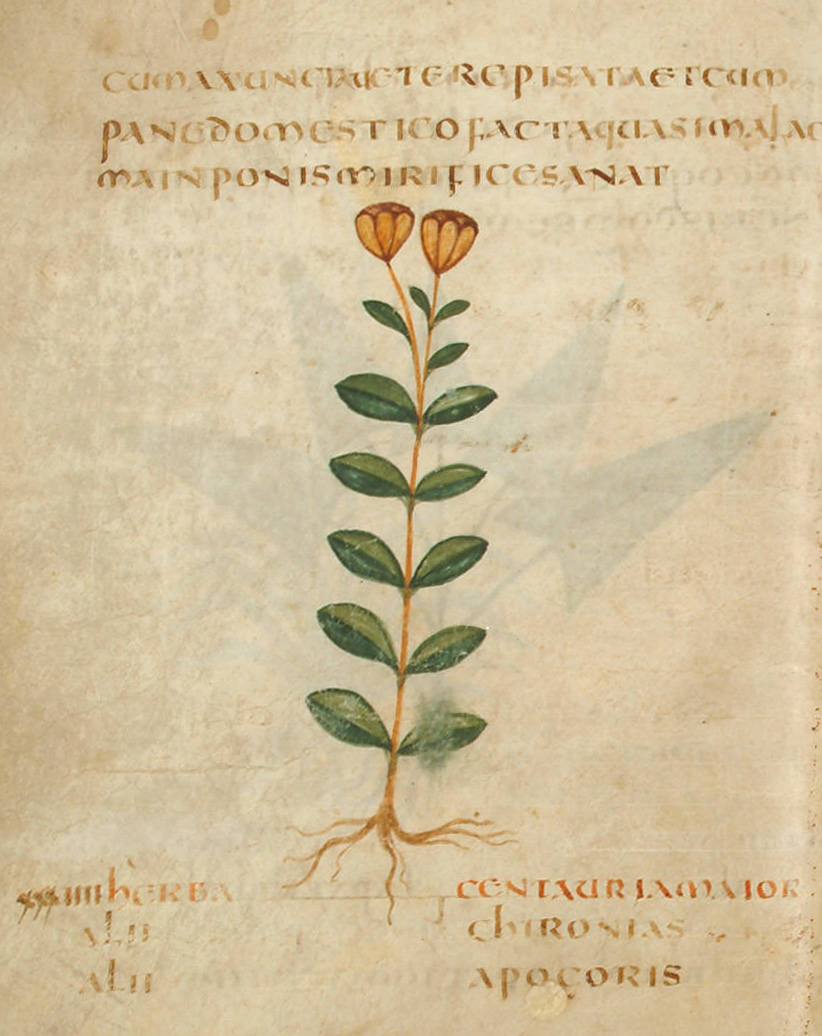
Manuscr. Leiden 6th cent Centauria maior

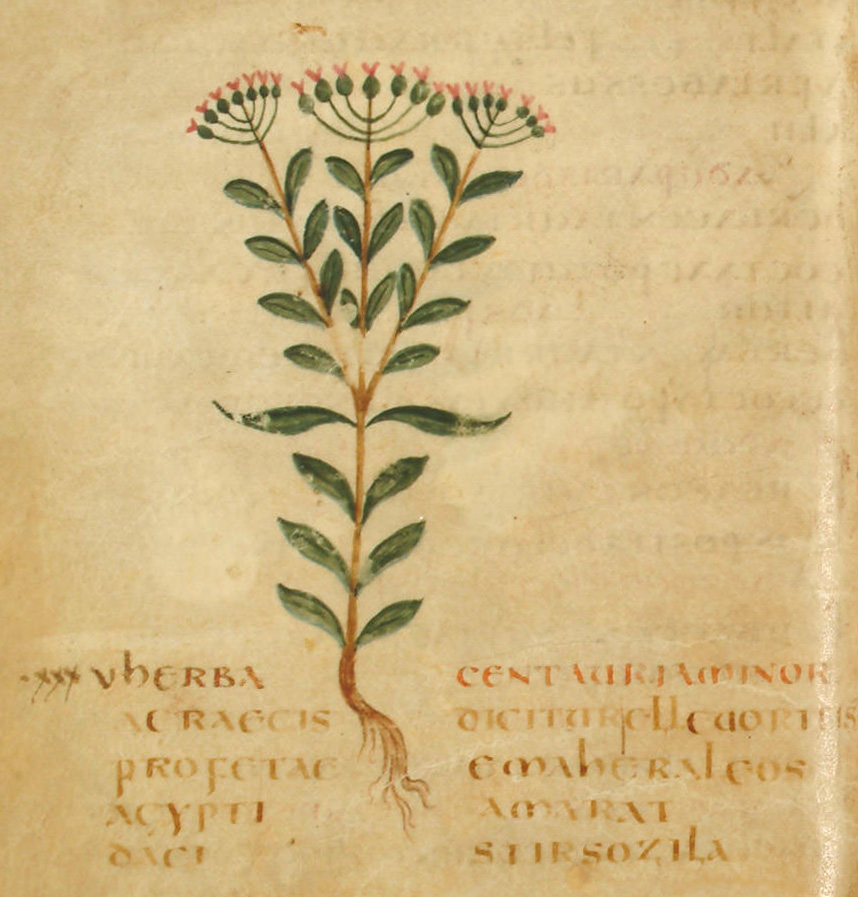
Manuscr. Leiden 6th cent Centauria minor

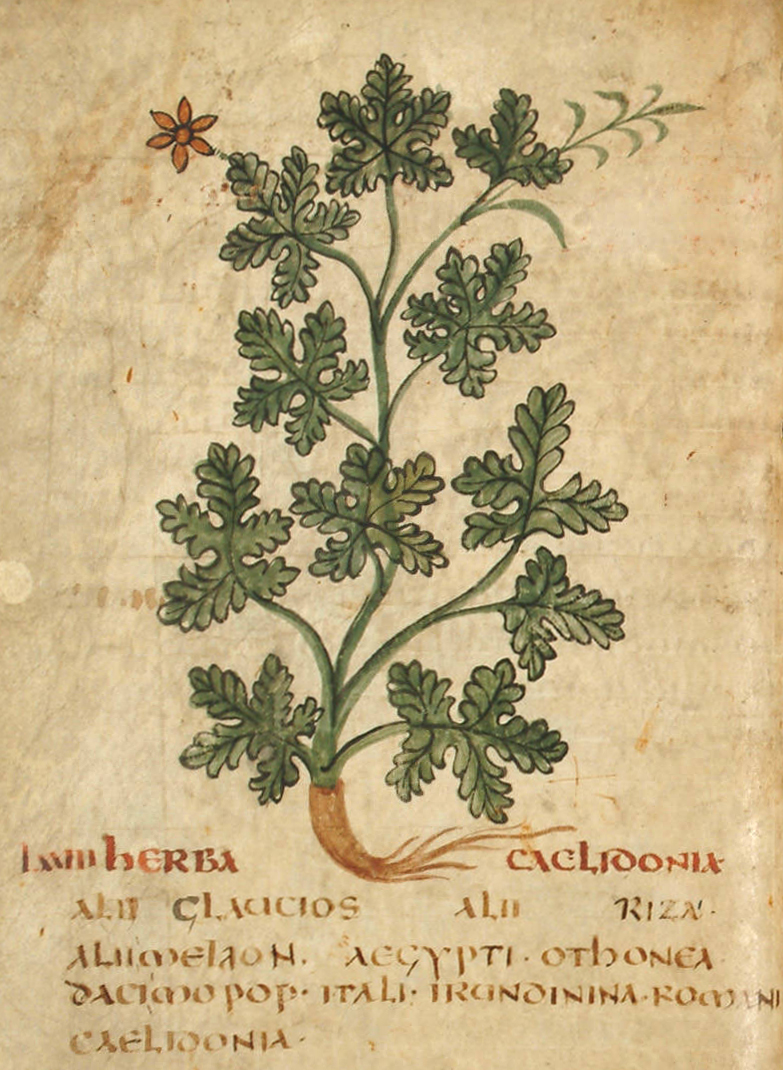
Manuscr. Leiden 6th cent Caelidonia

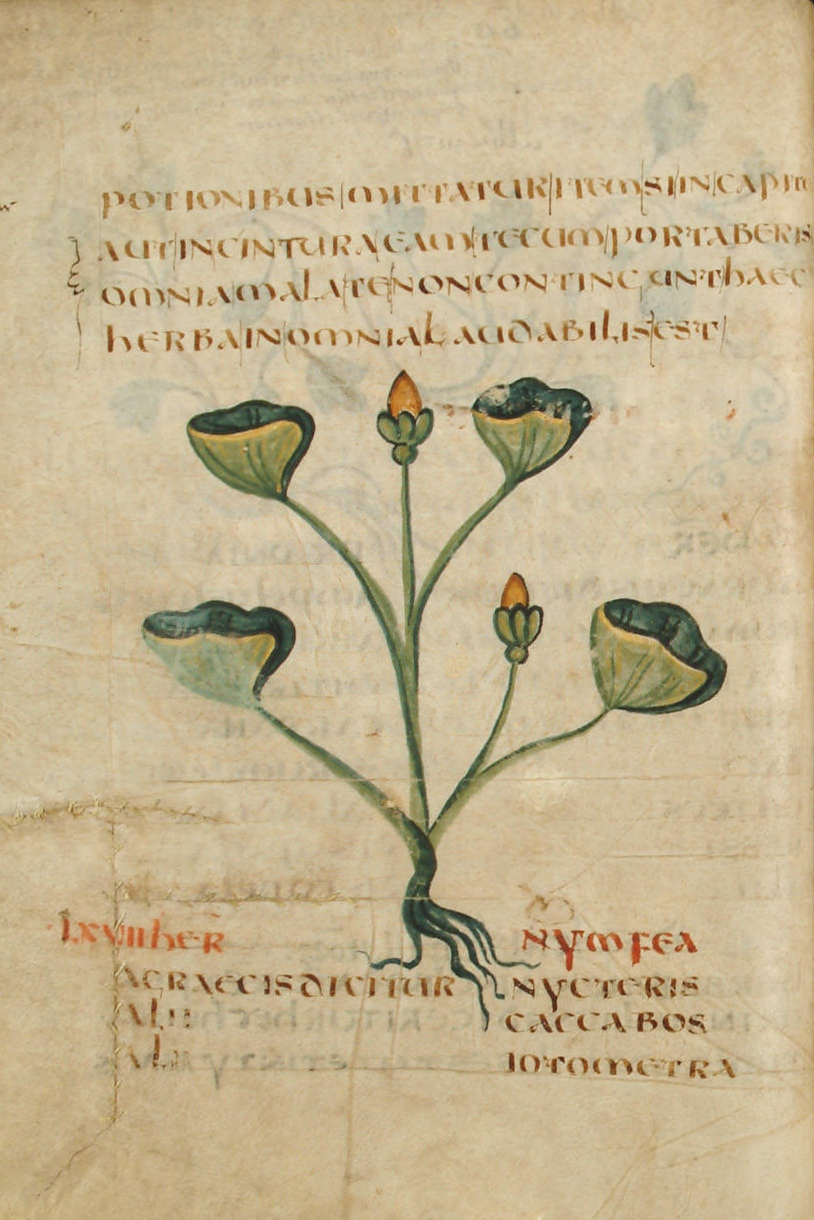
Manuscr. Leiden 6th cent Nymp[h]ea
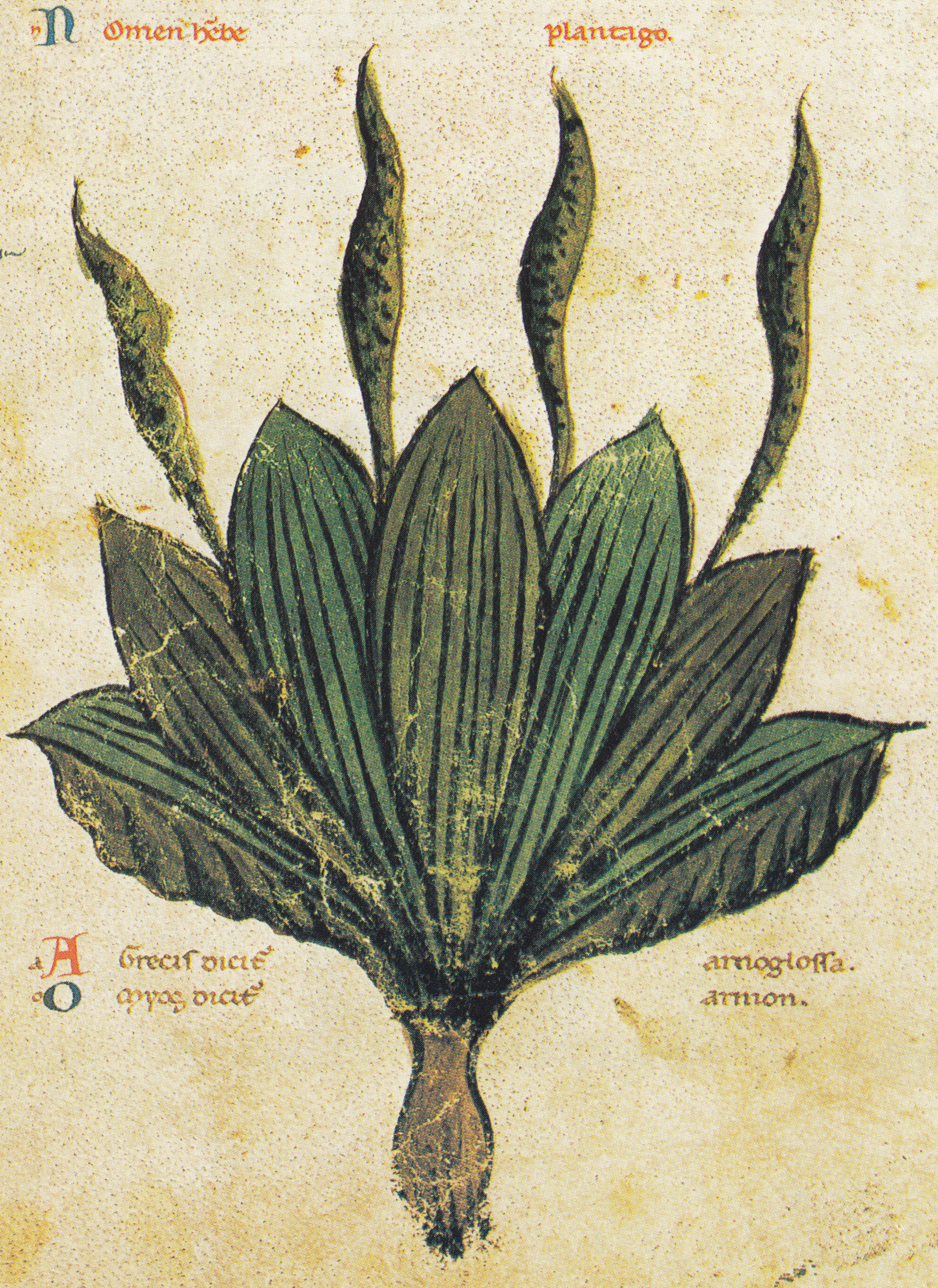
Cod. Vind. 93 13th cent. Arnoglossa. Plantago

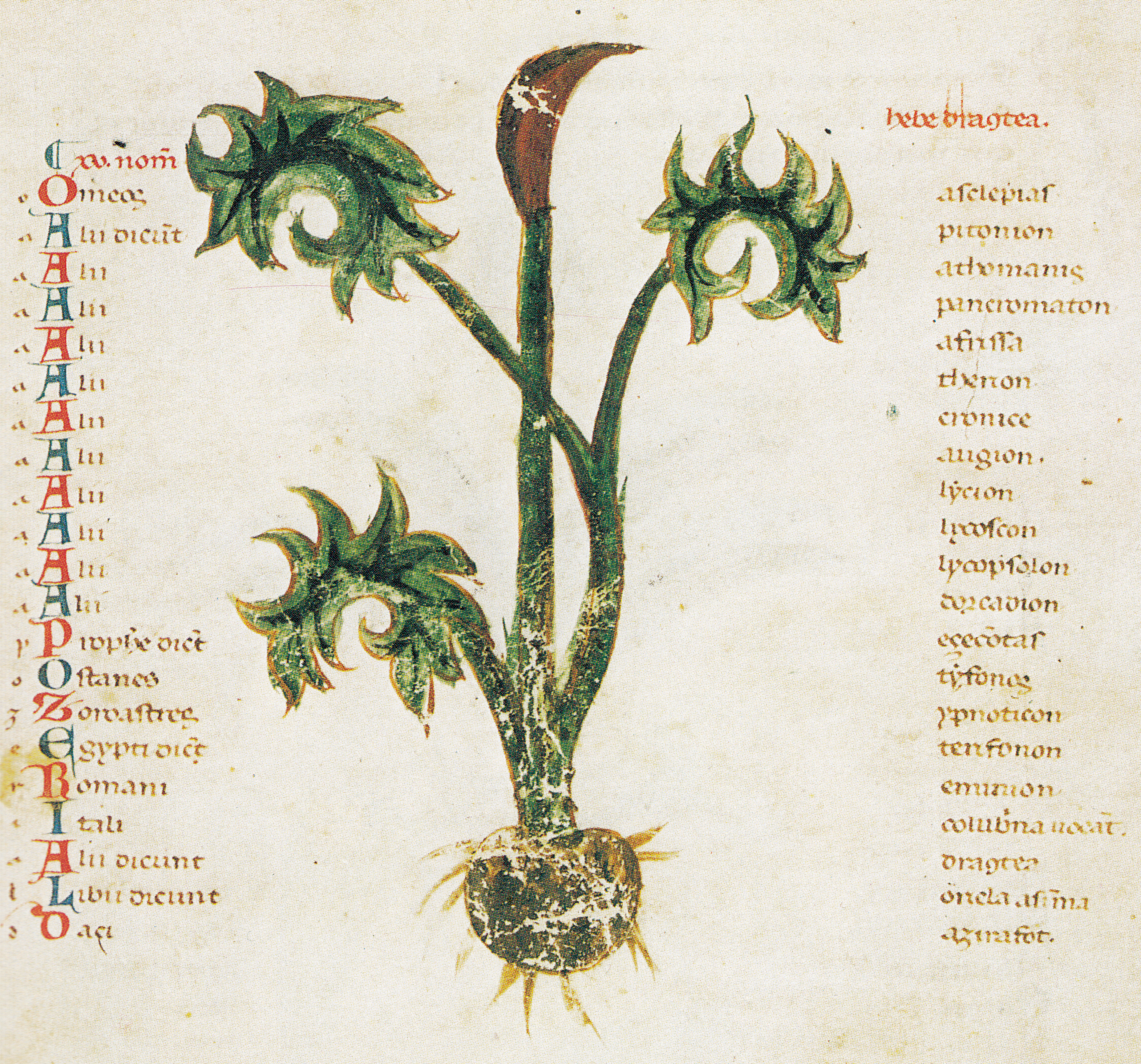
Cod. Vind. 93 13th cent. Drag[on]tea

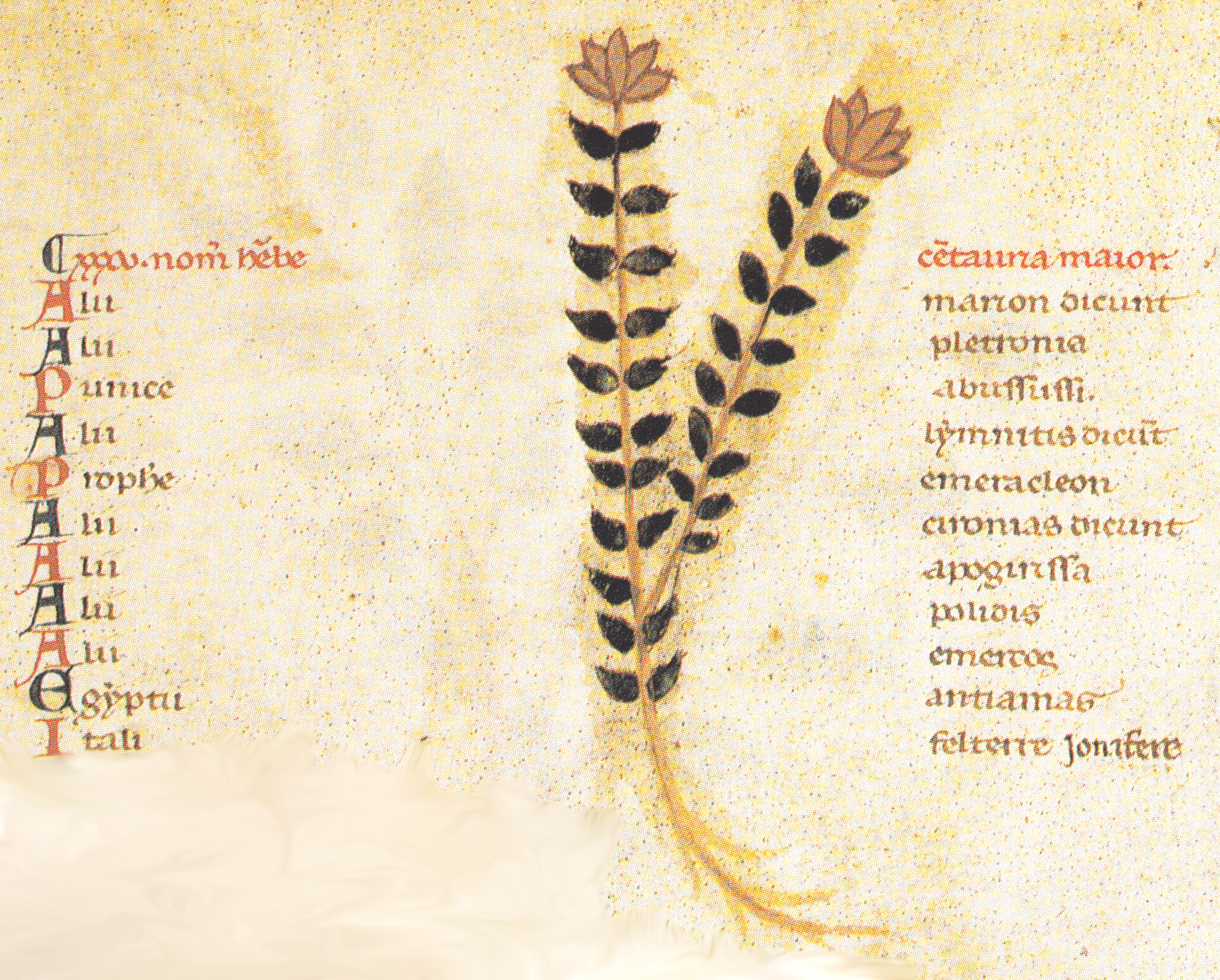
Cod. Vind. 93 13th cent. Centauria maior

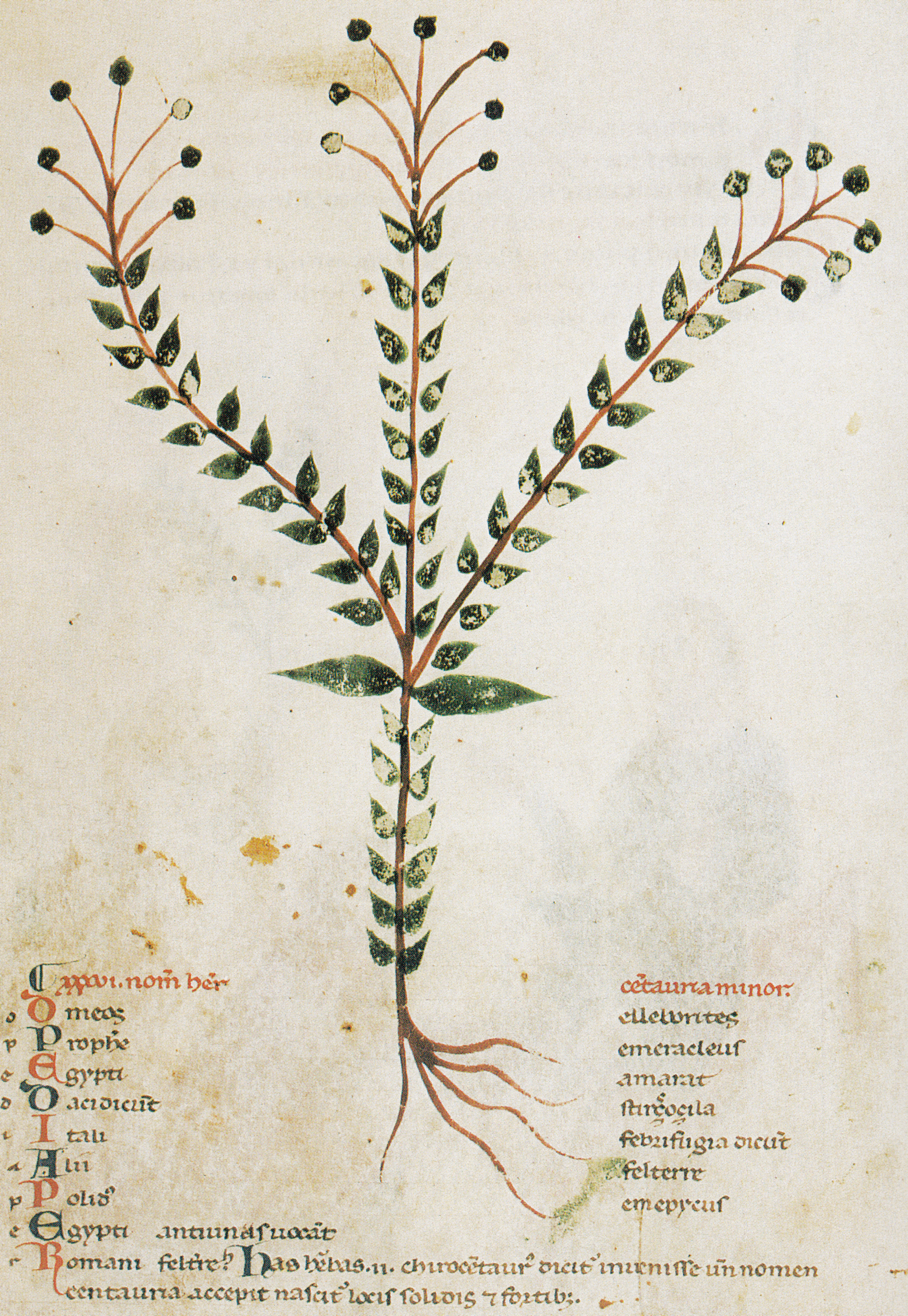
Cod. Vind. 93 13th cent. Centauria minor

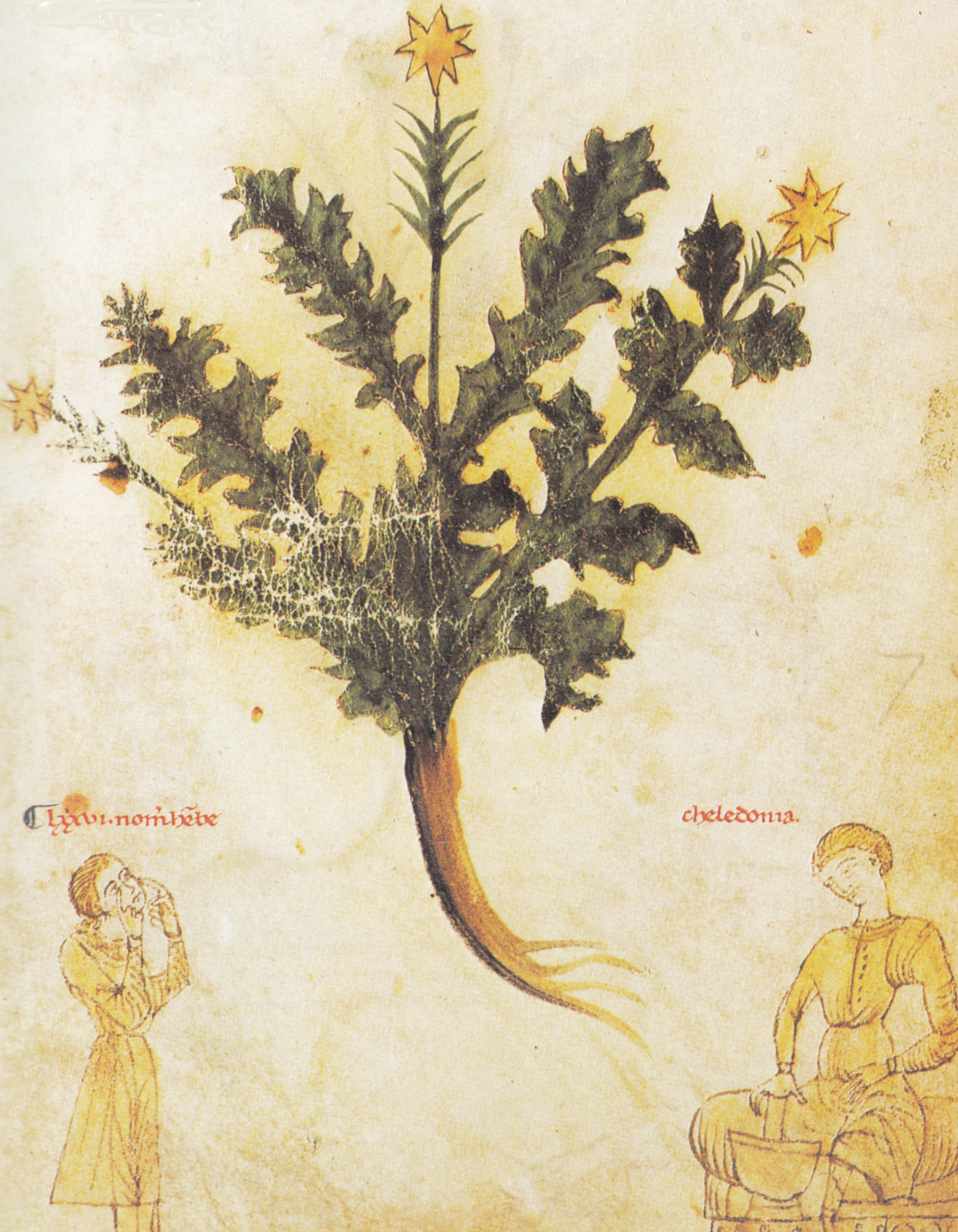
Cod. Vind. 93 13th cent. Chelidonia

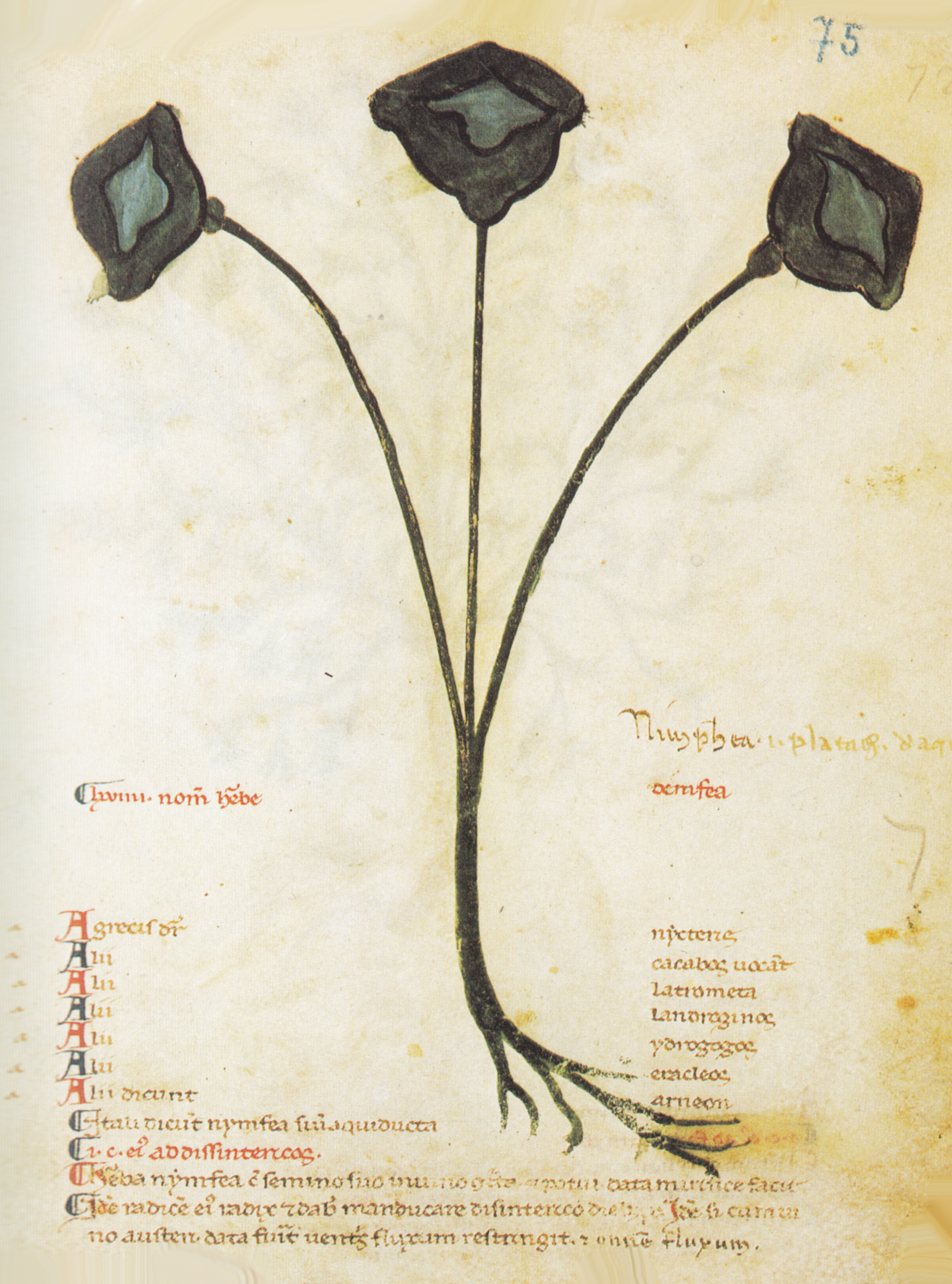
Cod. Vind. 93 13th cent. Ni[m]fea
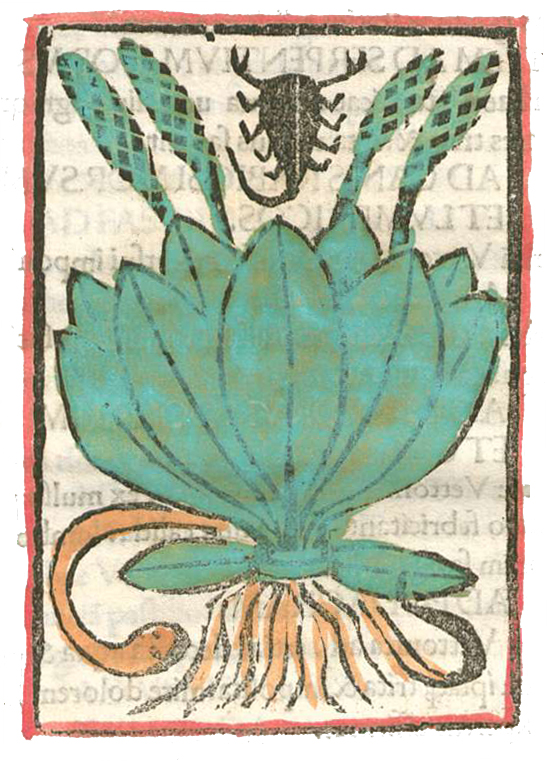
Print Rome 1481. Plantago, Arnoglossa

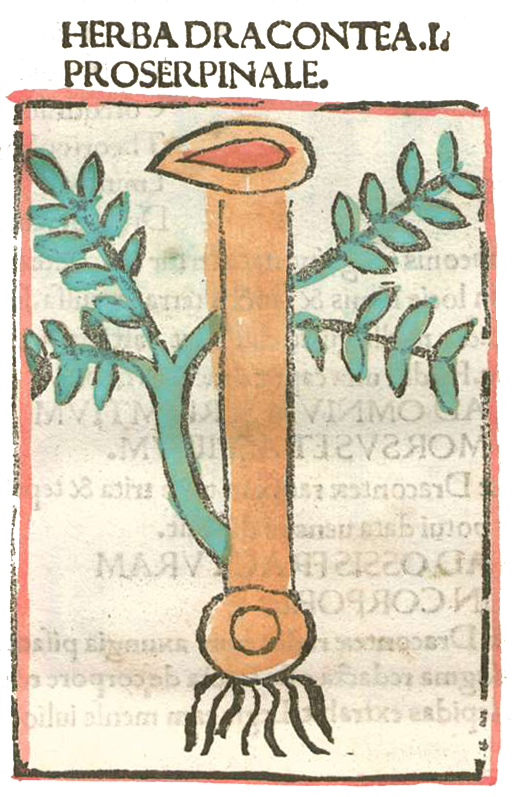
Print Rome 1481. Dracontea

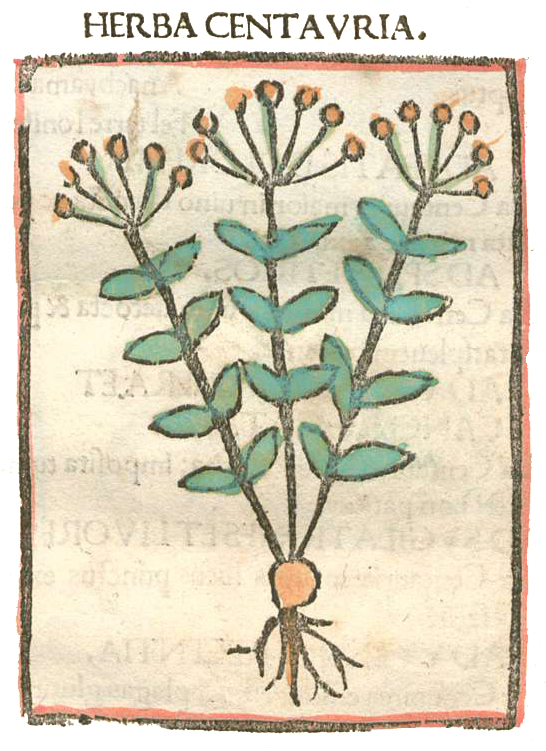
Print. Rome 1481. Centauria [maior]

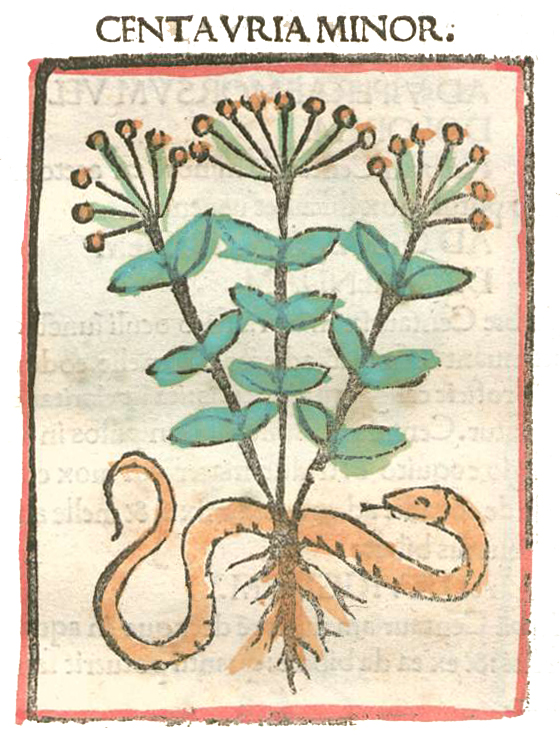
Print Rome 1481. Centauria minor

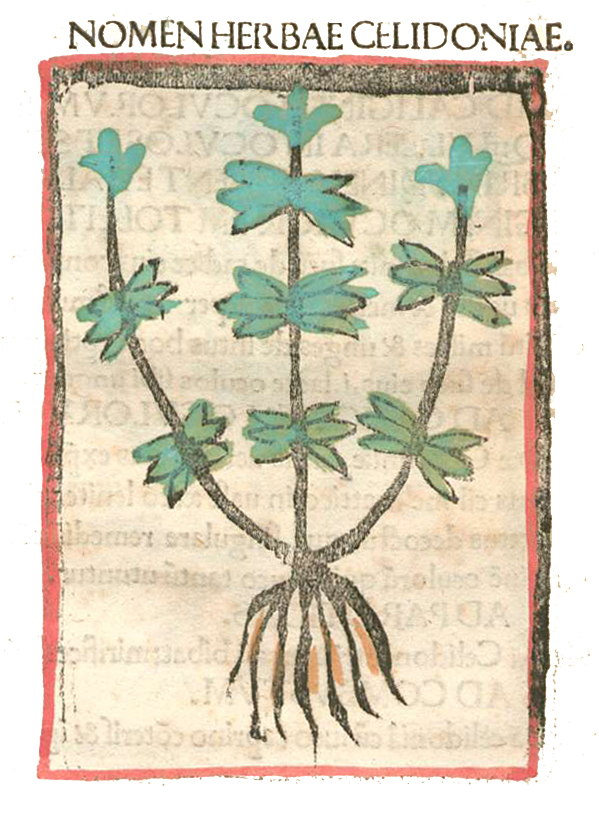
Print Rome 1481. Celidonia

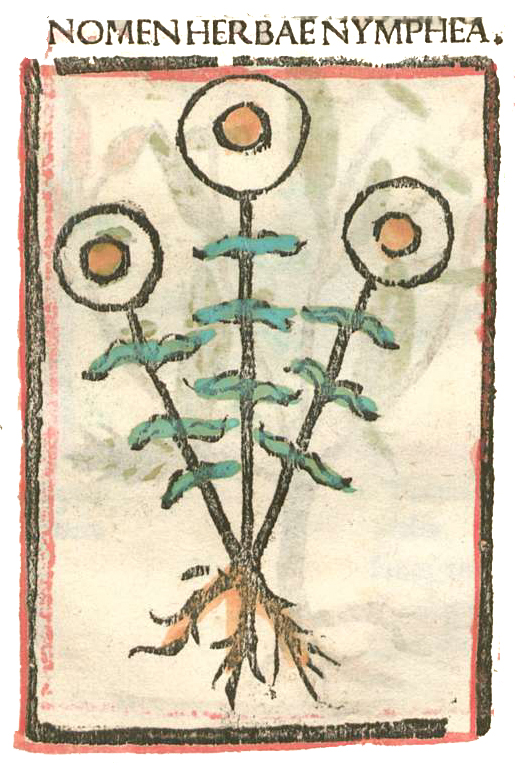
Print Rome 1481. Nymphea

=== Text ===
The text itself is based on earlier sources, mostly from Pliny the Elder's Naturalis Historia and Dioscorides's De materia medica. Scholars agree that it was compiled in the 4th century, from Latin sources, according to Sigerist, or from Greek sources, according to Singer. Each of the 128 to 131 chapters (the number varying between manuscripts) deals with one medical plant. In these chapters the name of the plant is followed by the enumeration of indications in the form of recipes and by synonyms of the plant's name.

For example: Chapter 89, Herba millefolium (Edition of Howald/Sigerist 1927):

Text (Howald/Sigerist 1927)	Translation
Herba millefolium	The herb millefolium [now interpreted as Achillea millefolium]
1. Ad dentium dolorem. Herbae millefolium radicem ieiunus conmanducet.	1. For toothache. The root of the herb millefolium should be chewed before breakfast.
2. Ad uulnera de ferro facta. Herba millefolium cum axungia pistata et inposita uulnera purgat et sanat.	2. For wounds inflicted by iron. If you put on the herb millefolium crushed in fat, so it cleans and heals wounds.
3. Ad tumores. Herbam millefolium contusam cum butiro inpone.	3. For tumours. Put on the herb millefolium crushed in butter.
4. Ad urinae difficultatem. Herbae millefolium sucus cum aceto bibitur, mire sanat.	4. For difficulties of urination. The juice of the herb millefolium drunk mixed with wine vinegar, heals wonderfully.
Nomina herbae. A Graecis dicitur miriofillon, alii ambrosiam, alii ciliofillon, alii crisitis, Galli mulicandos, alii uigentia, Daci diodela, Itali millefolium, alii militaris, alii Achillion, alii supercilium Veneris, alii cereum siluaticum. Hanc herbam Achilles inuenit, unde ferro percussus sanabat, quae ob id Achillea uocatur, de hac sanasse Telephium dicitur.	Names of the herb. The Greeks call it miriofillon, others ambrosia, others ciliofillon, others crisitis. The Gauls [call it] mulicandos, others vigentia. The Dacians [call it] diodela. The Italians [call it] millefolium, others militaris, others Achillion, others supercilium Veneris, others cereum silvaticum. This herb was discovered by Achilles because it healed wounds, beaten by iron. It was therefore named Achillea.
[Interpolationes ex Diosc.] Nascitur in palustris locis …	[Interpolations from the De materia medica of Dioscorides.] It grows in swampy areas ...

== Associated texts ==
In the surviving codices the Pseudo-Apuleius Herbarius was combined with other treatises:

1. De herba vettonica. Treatise dealing with the herb Stachys officinalis. It was falsely ascribed to Antonius Musa, physician of the Roman emperor Augustus.
2. Pseudo-Apuleius Herbarius.
3. De taxone liber. Anonymous treatise on the use of the European badger in medicine.
4. Liber medicinae ex animalibus ascribed to an unknown Roman physician named "Sextus Placitus Papyriensis".
  - A-version with 12 chapters about quadrupeds.
  - B-version with 31 chapters about quadrupeds, birds, reptiles, spiders, insects and humans.
5. (Pseudo-)Dioscorides de herbis femininis. According to Riddle written before the 6th century in Southern Europe.
6. Precatio terrae matris (Incantation of the mother of earth) and Precatio omnium herbarum (Incantation of all herbs).

== Manuscripts ==
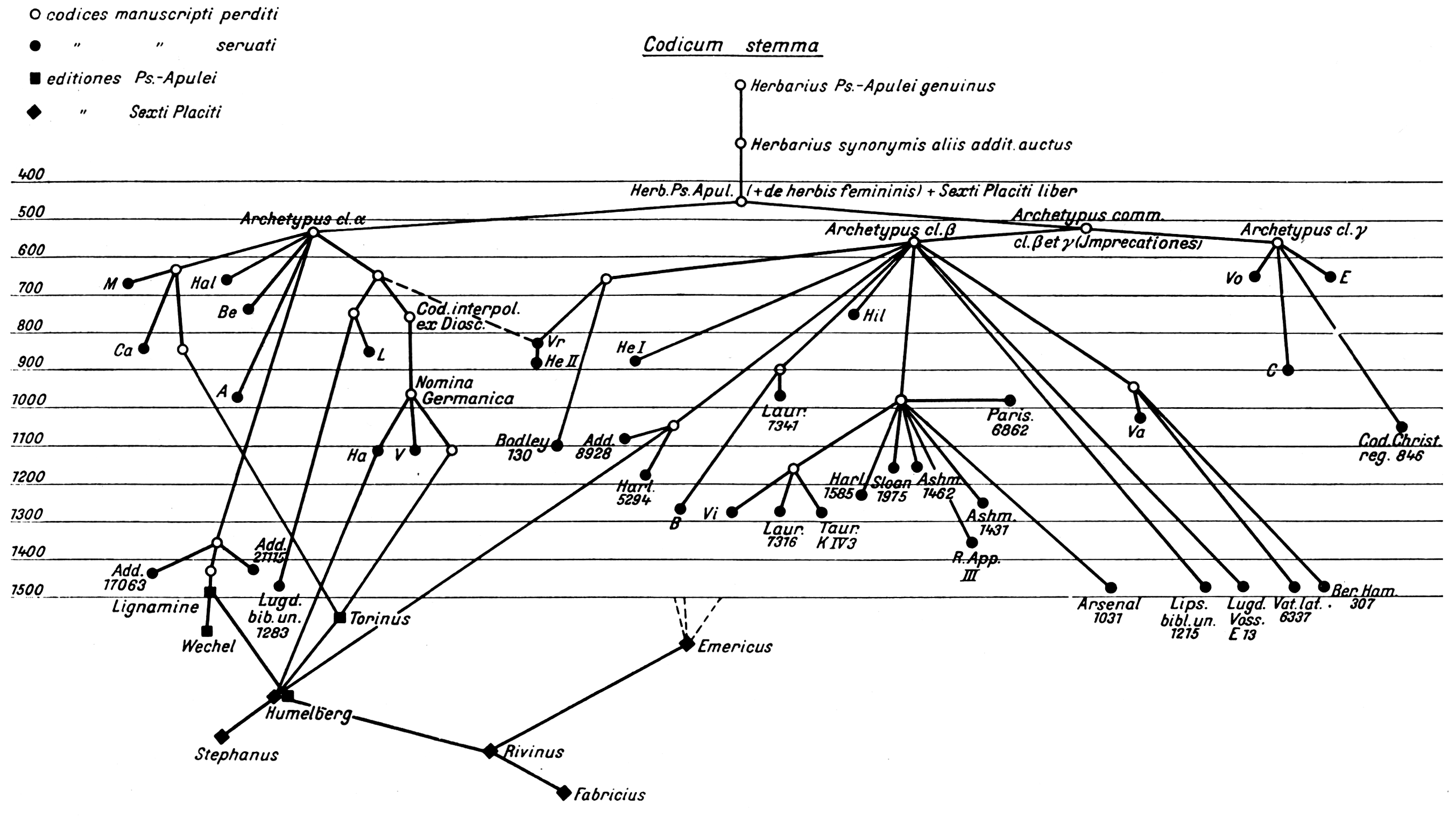
Manuscript classes according to Howald-Sigerist 1927 edition.

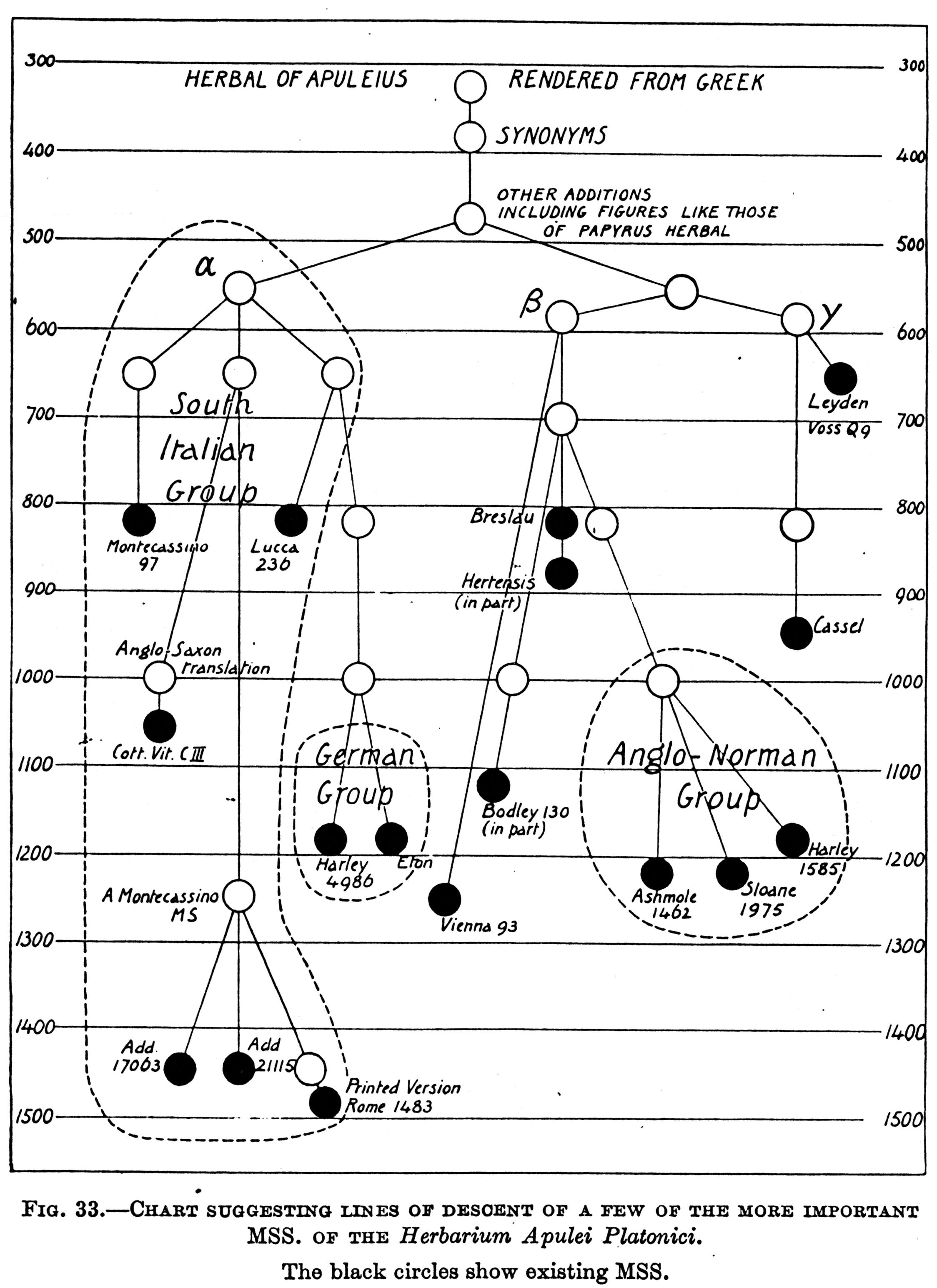
Simplified schedule by Singer 1927.

Howald and Sigerist (edition 1927, V–XVI) divided the codices into 3 classes (α, β and γ) according to the varying mixture of associated texts in the codices:

- α-class containing parts 1, 2, 3, 4a and 5, moreover better synonyms than in the β-class-texts and no interpolations. The α-class is considered to be the class with the best text-tradition.
- β-class containing parts 1, 2, 3, 4b, 5 and 6, moreover interpolations. The ß-class is considered to be the class with the best illustrations.
- γ-class containing parts 1, 2 and 6, without the interpolations of the β-class. γ-class contains the oldest manuscripts.

Class	Abbreviation (Howald/Sigerist)	Name of the codex	Century
α	Ca	Monte Cassino, Archivo de la Badia, Cod. 97	9th century.
α	M	Munich, Bayrische Staatsbibliothek, Fragmenta Emeranensia, Clm 14672, 14766 und 15028, in all 8 pages.	7th century.
α	L	Lucca, Bibliotheka Governativa, MS. 296	9th century.
α	Hal	Halberstadt, Domschatz (Bibliothek des Domgymnasiums), Inv.-Nr. 465–466 fol. Ir–IIv, Palimpsest (upper writing).	7th century.
α	Be	Berlin, Staatsbibliothek Fragmentum Berolinense Ms. Lat. fol. 381 no. 1	8th century.
α	Ha	London, British Library, Harley MS 4986	12th century.
α	V	Vienna, Codex Vindobonensis 187 (nach Grape-Albers 1977, p. 3: Eton College MS. 204)	12th century.
α	A	London, British Library, MS Cotton Vitellius C III	11th century.
β	Hil	Hildesheim, Beverinsche Bibliothek, MS. 658	8th century.
β	Vr	Bratislava, Codex Vratislaviensis Bibl. univ. III F 19	9th century.
β	Bodley 130	Oxford, Bodleian Library, MS. Bodley 130	11th century.
β	He	Herten, Codicis medici Hertensis, destroyed by fire	9th century.
β	B	Bamberg, Codex Bambergensis med 8 (L III.15)	13th century.
β	Laur. 7341	Florence, Bibliotheca Laurenziana, MS. 73,41	9th century.
β	Va	Vatican, Codex Vaticanus Barberinus 160	11th century.
β	Vat. Lat. 6337	Vatican, Codex Vaticanus lat. 6337	15th century.
β	Laur. 7316	Florence, Bibliotheca Laurenziana, MS. 73,16	13th century.
β	Vi	Vienna, Österreichische Nationalbibliothek, Herbarium Apuleii Platonici|Codex Vindobonensis 93	13th century.
β	Arsenal 1031	Paris, Bibliothèque de l’Arsenal, Codex 1031	15th century.
β	Paris 6862	Paris, Bibliothèque Nationale, MS. lat. 6862	10th century.
β	Ber	Berlin, Codex Berolinensis Hamil. 307	15th century.
γ	E	Fragmentum Epporigiense	7th century.
γ	Vo	Leiden, Universitätsbibliothek, MS. Voss. Lat. Q. 9	6th century.
γ	C	Kassel, Landesbibliothek, 2° MS. phys. et hist. nat. 10	10th century.

Singer (1927), Grape-Albers (1977, pp. 2–5) and Collins (2000) cited more manuscripts:

- St. Gallen, Stiftsbibliothek, Cod. 217, 9th century.
- London, British Library, Harley MS 585, 11th – 12th century.
- London, British Library, Harley MS 1585, 12th century.
- London, British Library, Harley MS 5294, 12th century.
- London, British Library, Harley MS 6258 B, 12th century.
- London, British Library, Sloane MS 1975, 12th century.
- Oxford, Bodleian Library, MS. Ashmole 1431, 11th century.
- Oxford, Bodleian Library, MS. Ashmole 1462, 12th century.
- Turin, Bibliotheca Universitaria, MS. K IV 3, 11th century, destroyed by fire.

Several more manuscripts can be added (see Mylène Pradel-Baquerre 2013 and Claudine Chavannes-Mazel 2016):

- Leiden, University Library, MS BPL 1283, c 1300 (related to Lucca)
- Leiden, University Library, MS Voss.Lat.Qu. 13, 10th century (Anglo-Saxon group)
- Leiden, University Library, MS Voss.Lat.Qu. 40, 11th century (German group)
- Montpellier, Bibliothèque de l'Ecole de Médecine, MS 277, 15th century
- The Hague, Museum Meermanno-Westreenianum MS 10 D 7, 10th century (alpha group)

== Translation: the Old English Herbarium ==
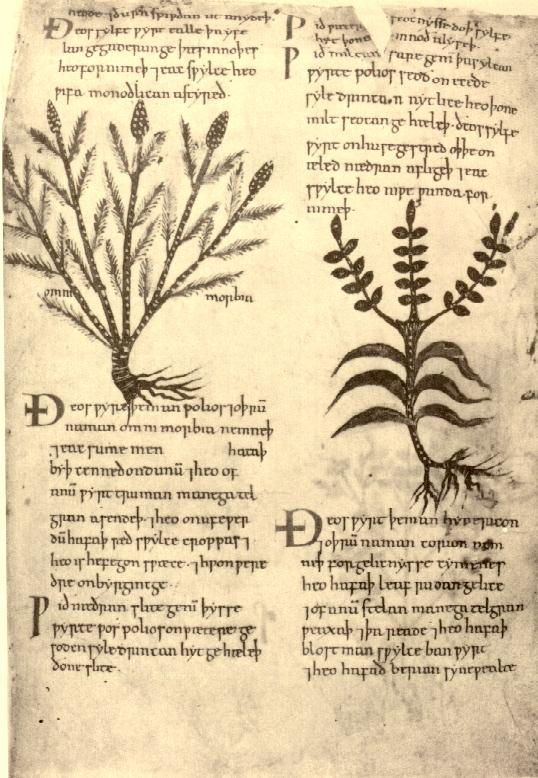
Page of the Old English Herbarium in Cotton Vitellius C III.

A version of the Pseudo-Apuleius Herbarius was translated into Old English, surviving now in four manuscripts:

- London, British Library, Cotton MS Vitellius C III (illustrated)
- Oxford, Bodleian Library, MS. Hatton 76
- London, British Library, Harley MS 585
- London, British Library, Harley MS 6258 B (updated into early Middle English)

Like many of the Latin manuscripts, it includes the Herbarium of Pseudo-Apuleius, De herba vetonica, De taxone, medicina de quadrupedibus, and the Liber medicinae ex herbis feminis. It was first edited and translated by Oswald Cockayne, re-edited in 1984 by Jan de Vriend, re-translated in 2002 by Anne Van Arsdall, and again re-edited and re-translated in 2023 by John D. Niles and Maria A. D'Aronco. A variety of dates and places have been suggested for the production of this translation, ranging from eighth-century Northumbria to late-tenth-century Winchester, with recent scholarship tending towards tenth-century Wessex.

== Incunabula and early printings ==
Based on a 9th-century manuscript of Monte Cassino the first incunable of Pseudo-Apuleius Herbarius was printed in Rome in 1481.

The first printing in northern Europe was done in 1537 in Zürich.

== Editions ==
- Howald, Ernst; Sigerist, Henry E. (1927). Antonii Musae De herba vettonica, Liber Pseudo-Apulei her-barius, Anonymi De taxone liber, Sexti Placiti Liber medicinae ex animalibus. Corpus medicorum latinorum (in Latin). Vol. IV. Leipzig: B. G. Teubner.
- de Vriend, Hubert Jan (ed.), The Old English Herbarium and Medicina de Quadrupedibus, The Early English Text Society, 286 (London: Oxford University Press, 1984). (Contains a Latin text alongside the Old English.)
- Kai Brodersen (2015). Apuleius, Heilkräuterbuch / Herbarius, Latin and German. Marix, Wiesbaden. ISBN 978-3-7374-0999-5
- Niles, John D. and Maria A. D'Aronco (ed. and trans.), Medical Writings from Early Medieval England, Volume I: The Old English Herbal, Lacnunga, and Other Texts, Dumbarton Oaks Medieval Library 81 (Cambridge, MA: Harvard University Press, 2023). Old English and Modern English translation.

== Sources ==
- Claudine A. Chavannes-Mazel, L. IJpelaar (eds), The Green Middle Ages. The Depiction and Use of Plants in the Western World, Amsterdam University Press, Amsterdam 2022. ISBN 978 94 6372 619 1. Dutch edition Lecturis 2016 and 2019. ISBN 978-94-6226-297-3
- Collins, Minta (September 2000). Medieval Herbals. The Illustrative Traditions. British Library Studies in Medieval Culture. London: University of Toronto Press. pp. 165–220. ISBN 9780802083135.
- Grape-Albers, Heide (1977). Spätantike Bilder aus der Welt des Arztes. Medizinische Bilderhandschriften der Spätantike und ihre mittelalterliche Überlieferung [Late Antiquity images from the world of the physician. Medical illuminated manuscripts of the late antiquity and medieval tradition] (in German). Wiesbaden: Guido Pressler. ISBN 9783876460376.
- Hollis, Stephanie; Wright, Michael (1992). Old English prose of secular learning. Cambridge: Brewer. ISBN 9780859913430.
- Sigerist, Henry E. (1930). "Zum Herbarius Pseudo-Apuleius". Sudhoffs Archiv (in German). 23: 197–204.
- Singer, Charles (1927). "The Herbal in the Antiquity". The Journal of Hellenic Studies. XLVII: 1–52 (37–48). doi:10.2307/625251. JSTOR 625251. S2CID 163356763.
- Sudhoff, Karl (1916). "Szenen aus der Sprechstunde und bei Krankenbesuchen des Arztes in mittelalterlichen Handschriften". Sudhoffs Archiv (in German). 10: 71–90.
- Swarzenski, Georg (1902). "Mittelalterliche Kopien einer antiken medizinischen Bilderhandschrift". Jahrbuch des kaiserlichen deutschen archäologischen Instituts (in German). XVII: 45–53.
