= Numenius =

Numenius can refer to:

== Ancient Greeks ==
- Numenius of Apamea, Syrian Greek philosopher of the 2nd century CE
- Numenius, son of Antiochus in 1 Maccabees 12:16
- Noumenios, Seleucid general and satrap of the 3rd/2nd century BCE
- Numenius of Heraclea, physician and author.
- Numenius, an author who wrote a work on venomous animals (Θηριακά), which is cited by the scholiast on Nicander.
- Noumenios of Citium, his name appears in an inscription among the Athenian Greek-Phoenician inscriptions.

== Other ==
- Curlew, any of 9 species of birds grouped in the genus Numenius
