= Antipater (astrologer) =

Ancient Greek astrologer

Antipater (Ancient Greek: Ἀντίπατρος) was an astrologer of ancient Greece of uncertain date. He wrote a work upon genethlialogia, in which he endeavored to explain man's fate, not from the circumstances under which he was born, but from those under which he had been conceived. Nothing further is known of his life.

== See also ==
- Archinapolus
