= Antipas =

Antipas can refer to:

- Herod Antipas, an ancient ruler of Galilee and Perea
- Antipater the Idumaean, the founder of the Herodian Dynasty, father of Herod the Great, and grandfather of Herod Antipas
- Antipas of Pergamum, martyred bishop of the early Christian Church, referred to in the Biblical book of Revelation
- Antipas, Cotabato, a municipality in the Philippines
- Antipas (tribe), one of several Jivaroan peoples indigenous to the upper Amazon
- Antipas (Millennium), a third-season episode of Millennium
- Quincy Antipas (born 1984), Zimbabwean footballer

== See also ==
- Antipater (disambiguation)
