= Archigenes =

2nd-century Greek physician

Archigenes (Greek: Αρχιγένης), an ancient Greco-Syrian physician, who lived in the 1st and 2nd centuries AD.

Archigenes was the most celebrated of the sect of the Eclectici, and was a native of Apamea in Syria; he practiced at Rome in the time of Trajan, 98–117, where he enjoyed a very high reputation for his professional skill. He is, however, reprobated as having been fond of introducing new and obscure terms into the science, and having attempted to give to medical writings a dialectic form, which produced rather the appearance than the reality of accuracy. Archigenes published a treatise on the pulse, on which Galen wrote a Commentary; it appears to have contained a number of minute and subtle distinctions, many of which have no real existence, and were for the most part the result rather of a preconceived hypothesis than of actual observation; and the same remark may be applied to an arrangement which he proposed of fevers.

Archigenes, however, not only enjoyed a considerable degree of the public confidence during his lifetime, but left behind him a number of disciples, who for many years maintained a respectable rank in their profession. The name of the father of Archigenes was Philippus; he was a pupil of Agathinus, whose life he once saved; and he died at the age either of 63 or 83.

The titles of several of Archigenes' works are preserved, of which, however, nothing but a few fragments remain; some of these have been preserved by other ancient authors, and some are still in manuscript in the King's Library at Paris. By some writers he is considered to have belonged to the sect of the Pneumatici.

Archigenes is mentioned several times by Juvenal, in his Satires.
