= Vital heat =

Vital heat, also called innate or natural heat, or calidum innatum, is a term in Ancient Greek medicine and philosophy that has generally referred to the heat produced within the body, usually the heat produced by the heart and the circulatory system. Vital heat was a somewhat controversial subject because it was formerly believed that heat was acquired by an outside source such as the element of fire.

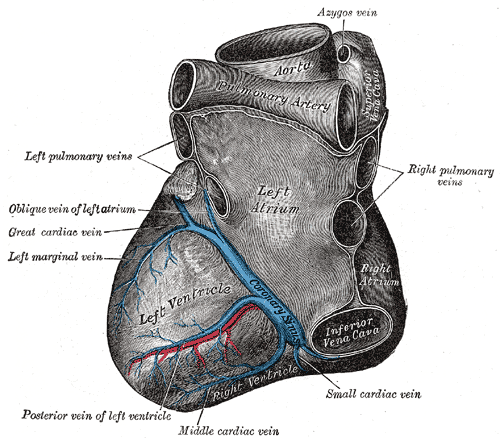
The human heart, thought to be the source of vital heat

== Origin of concept ==
It was a previously accepted concept that heat was absorbed through external sources; however, the concept of vital heat was more or less stumbled upon by a physiological observation that associates cold with the dead and heat with the living. "For the concept of vital heat we may – somewhat arbitrarily – take our starting point in Parmenides. His correlation of dead with cold, alive with warm, may not have been primarily intended as a contribution to physiology, yet the physiological significance of this thought was perceived by his successors; witness Empedocles, who taught 'sleep comes about when the heat of the blood is cooled to the proper degree, death when it becomes altogether cold'". Aristotle would eventually modify this doctrine stating that "sleep is a temporary overpowering of the inner heat by other factors in the body, death its final extinction."

== Vital heat and ancient medicine ==
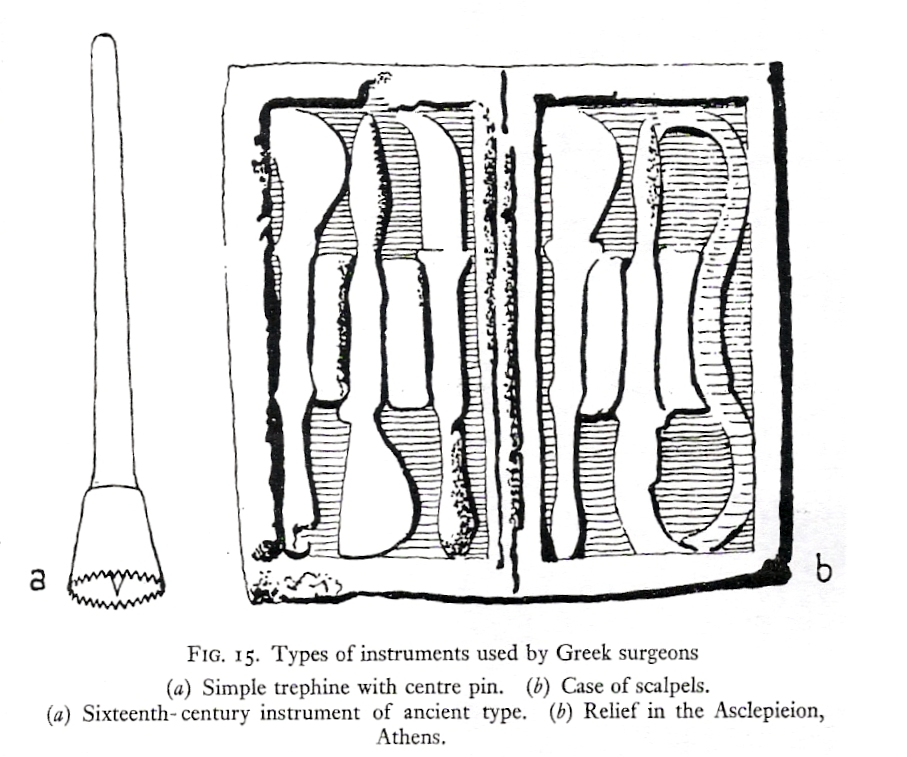
Tools of Ancient Greek medicine

According to Ancient Greek physicians, vital heat was produced by the heart, maintained by the pneuma (air, breath, spirit or soul), and circulated throughout the body by blood vessels, which were thought to be intact tubes using blood to transmit heat. Aristotle supported this argument by showing that when the heart is made cold compared to other organs, the individual dies. He believed that the heat produced in the heart caused blood to react in a similar way to boiling, expanding out through the blood vessels with every beat. This extreme heat, according to him, can lead to a self-consuming flame if it is not cooled by air from the lungs.

Galen wrote in On the Usefulness of the Parts of the Body (170): "The heart is, as it were, the hearthstone and source of the innate heat by which the animal is governed." In the 11th century, Avicenna agreed with this notion, stating that the heart produced breath, the "vital power or innate heat" within the body, in his Canon of Medicine.

Later, the term innate heat was attributed to friction caused by the motion of blood through arteries, as evidenced by the Cyclopaedia (1728):

"For 'tis hence we know, that this innate Heat is no more than the Attrition of the Parts of the Blood; occasion'd by its circulatory Motion, especially in the Arteries."

== Aristotle's views ==
Aristotle believed that the source of vital heat lies in the heart and is intimately connected to the soul. "This link is not for Aristotle simply an accidental connection, but rather the existence of vital heat is necessitated by the most basic living activity: nutrition. In De anima ii 4.416b28-29, Aristotle says: 'All food must be capable of being digested, and that whose activity causes digestion is heat. For this reason, every animate thing has heat.'". Although prominent scholars like Aristotle accepted this concept of innate heat and its role in digestion, there were others who were skeptical and retained a different point of view. "However, if we look for antecedents of Aristotle's theories, the most important are probably to found in the Timaeus. Here Plato shows in some detail how in respiration the 'Hot' in us is cooled by the air which enters from outside, and he relies on the cutting power of the fire, which here is identical to the 'Hot', to explain the process of digestion

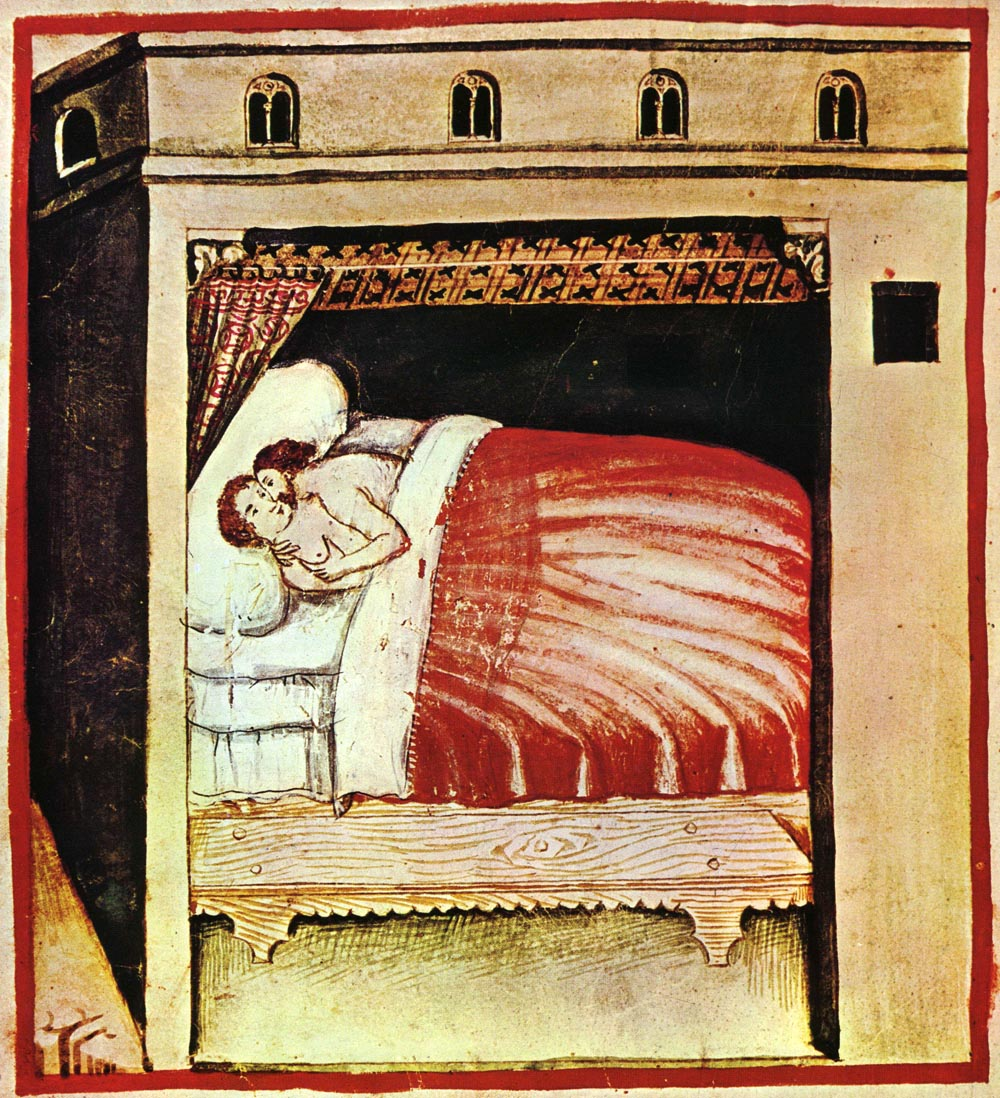
Aristotle believed that vital heat played a vital role in reproduction.

Along with his theory of the role of vital heat in nutrition and digestion, Aristotle believed that vital heat played a role in reproduction which includes several physical parts of the body different from the parts that participate in nutrition. Aristotle believed that blood was created through the process of digestion via vital heat and then pushed to the extremities of the body. However, blood is not in its final form but is transformed to a final substance to be used for the nourishment of the body. "Aristotle holds that semen is nutriment in its final stage of concoction before it becomes part of the body. Hence, blood, before it turns into flesh, bones, etc., first turns into semen." Although blood is not in its final form, it can still be used to nourish the body and create flesh and bone. "Young males do not have semen because the conversion into flesh and bone must be done quickly owing to their rapid growth. And women do not have semen because they are not as hot as men and so lack the power of concocting blood into semen." Blood in women is then naturally used to explain the menses. Therefore, when a male and female copulate and semen is emitted in the woman, the menses and the semen mix and begin a process that creates a new organism. "That it is the heat of the semen that gives it the power to concoct the menses is shown, according to Aristotle by the fact that in some insects which do not produce semen the female inserts a part of her body into the male which then is acted upon by the heat of the male".

== See also ==
- Homeostasis
- On Breath
- Pneuma (ancient medicine)
- Thermoregulation
