= Eclectic school =

The Eclectic school of medicine (Eclectics, or Eclectici, Greek: Ἐκλεκτικοί) was an ancient school of medicine in ancient Greece and Rome. They were so-called because they selected from each sect the opinions which seemed to them most probable. They seemed to have been a branch of the Methodic school. They were apparently founded by Archigenes. Some of the opinions of these physicians are found in the fragments preserved by Galen, Oribasius, Aëtius, etc.; but the doctrines they adopted remain unknown.

A closely related school was the Episynthetic school (Episynthetici), so called because they heaped up in a manner (episyntithêmi), and adopted for their own opinions different, and even opposite, schools. It seems to have been founded by Agathinus of Sparta, the pupil of Athenaeus, and the master of Archigenes, towards the end of the 1st century AD. The only other ancient physician who is mention as having belonged to this sect is Leonides of Alexandria, who may have lived in the 3rd century. Little is known of the opinions of these physicians, or their tenets.
