= Dieuches =

Dieuches, (Greek: Διεύχης), a Greek physician, who lived probably in the 4th century BC, and belonged to the Dogmatic school of medicine. He was tutor to Numenius of Heraclea, and is several times quoted by Pliny. He wrote some medical works, of which nothing but a few fragments remain.
