= Philumenus =

Greek physician

Philumenus (Greek: Φιλούμενος), a Greek physician, mentioned by an anonymous writer as one of the most eminent members of his profession. Nothing is known of the events of his life, and with respect to his date, as the earliest author who quotes him is Oribasius, it can only be said that he must have lived in or before the 4th century. It was thought that none of his work survived until 1907 when a manuscript of excerpts of his work De venenatis animalibus eorumque remediis (On poisonous animals and their remedies) was discovered in the Vatican library (codex Vaticanus gr. 284) by the German scholar Max Wellmann, who published an edition in 1908.

Numerous fragments are preserved by Aëtius Amidenus. He is quoted also by Alexander of Tralles, and Rhazes.
