= Antipater (writer) =

Antipater (Ancient Greek: Ἀντίπατρος) was an Ancient Greek writer whose work is now lost. He is attested to have written about the interpretation of dreams (Oneirocritica), by fellow writer on dreams Artemidorus in his Oneirocritica. Artemidorus mentions Antipater's writings citing Antipater’s passage about a dream where the dreamer had sexual intercourse with a piece of iron.
