= Aelius Marcianus =

3rd-century Roman jurist

Aelius Marcianus was a Roman jurist who wrote after the death of Septimius Severus, whom he calls Divus in his excerpts from the Pandects. Other passages in the same source show that he was then writing under Antoninus Caracalla, the son and successor of Severus. It also appears from his Institutiones that he survived Caracalla. It is therefore probable that he also wrote under Alexander Severus, whose reign commenced 222 AD. Caracalla died in 217. Another Aelius Marcianus is cited in the Pandects, who was proconsul of Hispania Baetica in the time of Antoninus Pius.

The works of Marcianus, from which there are excerpts in the Pandects, are:

- Sixteen books of Institutiones, from which there are excerpts in the Pandects: this work was also used for the compilation of Justinian's Institutions;
- Two books on Publica Judicia.
- Two books on Appellationes.
- Five books titled Regularia.
- A single book on Delatores.
- A single book on the Hypothecaria Formula.
- A single book ad Sct. Turpillianum.

Marcianus also wrote notes on Papinian. Marcianus is cited by Ulpianus and Paulus. There are 275 excerpts from Marcianus in the Pandects.

There are rescripts addressed by Alexander Severus to "A. Marcianus" and to "A. Martianus", which may be the same name, and one by Gordian to "A. Martianus" in the year 239; but this may be a different person from the jurist whose writings are excerpted in the Pandects.
