= Arcyon =

1st-century Roman physician

Arcyon (Ancient Greek: Ἀρκύων), or, as others read, Alcyon (Ἀλκύων), was a surgeon in ancient Rome, who was mentioned by the historian Josephus as having been called in to attend to those persons who had been wounded at the emperor Caligula's assassination in the year 41 AD. Several conspirators owed their lives to Arcyon, as he spirited them away via a passage on the pretext of needing to find medical supplies.
