= Archinapolus =

Ancient Greek astrologer

Archinapolus was an Hellenistic astrologer of the late Hellenistic period. According to Vitruvius he left rules for casting nativities, based not on the moment of birth but on that of conception. It is possible that he was associated with the school of astrologers Berossus and Antipater.
