= Antipater of Acanthus =

Antipater (Ancient Greek: Ἀντίπατρος) of Acanthus was a grammarian of ancient Greece, of uncertain date, probably the same as the one mentioned by the Scholiast on Aristophanes.

Some scholars consider this Antipater to be entirely fictional, and a source fabricated by Ptolemaeus Chennus, to assert the existence of a version of the Iliad that predates Homer's, written, Ptolemaeus said, by Dares Phrygius, a participant in the events of the Trojan War.
