= Menemachus =

Greek physician

Menemachus, (Greek: Μενέμαχος), a Greek physician born at one of the cities named Aphrodisias, who belonged to the Methodic school of medicine, and lived in the 2nd century. He wrote some works which are not now extant, and is probably the physician quoted by Caelius Aurelianus, Galen, and Oribasius. The Menemachus, however, who is quoted by Celsus, is not the same person, and must have lived at least a century earlier.
