= Numenius of Heraclea =

Ancient Greek physician and poet

Numenius of Heraclea (Ancient Greek: Νουμένιος ὁ Ἡρακλεώτης, Nouménios ho Hērakléōtēs) is ancient Greek physician and poet, dated to the end of the 4th century BC. According to Athenaeus, he was a pupil of the physician Dieuches.

The author is registered in the TLG Canon as tlg0703.

== Works ==
Numenius wrote didactic poems on a range of topics, including:

- Ἁλιευτικόν/Halieutikón, "On Fishing"
- Θηριακόν/Thēriakón, "On theriac"
- a work on medicinal prescriptions
- Δείπνων ἀναγραφαί/Deípnōn anagraphaí, "Records of Banquets"

== Bibliography ==
- H. Diller. s.v. Numenius (7a). RE Suppl. 7. 663-664
- Fornaro, Sotera (October 1, 2006). "Numenius". Brill's New Pauly – via referenceworks.brillonline.com.S. Fornaro. "Numenius" (1). Brill's New Pauly
- E. Kaczyńska. "The Cretan Origin of Numenius Heracleotes in the Light of Ancient Greek Dialectology". Κρητικά Χρονικά 23 (2013), 35-43 ISSN 0454-5206
- Lloyd-Jones, Hugh; Parsons, Peter, eds. (1983). "Numenius Heracleota". Supplementum Hellenisticum. Berlin, New York: De Gruyter. pp. 279–286. doi:10.1515/9783110837766.279b. ISBN 9783110837766 – via www.degruyter.com.
