= Publius Aelius Fortunatus =

2nd century Roman painter

Publius Aelius Fortunatus was a Roman painter.

His name became known due to his epitaph in the city of Rome. He was a freedman – a libertus – and lived in the 2nd century CE.

== Literature ==
- Günther Bröker, "Adymos", Rainer Vollkommer: Künstlerlexikon der Antike, Nikol, Hamburg 2007, p. 4, ISBN 978-3-937872-53-7
