= Leonidas (physician) =

Greek physician

Leonidas, (Greek: Λεωνίδας), a Greek physician who was a native of Alexandria, and belonged to the sect of the Episynthetici. As he is quoted by Caelius Aurelianus, and himself quotes Galen, he probably lived in the 2nd and 3rd centuries. Of his writings, which appear to have been chiefly related to surgical subjects, nothing now remains but some fragments preserved by Aëtius and Paul of Aegina, from which we may judge that he was a skillful practitioner.

Leonidas followed Galen in advocating the excision of breast cancer via a wide cut through normal tissues, but recommended alternate incision and cautery, which became the standard for the next 15 centuries. He provided the first detailed description of a mastectomy, which included the first description of nipple retraction as a clinical sign of breast cancer, and advocated systemic "detoxification of the body".
