= Dexippus of Cos =

Dexippus of Cos (Ancient Greek: Δέξιππος ὁ Κῷος; 4th century BC), also called Dioxippus, was a Greek physician of Cos, who was one of the pupils of the celebrated Hippocrates, and lived in the 4th century BC. Hecatomnus, prince of Caria (385–377 BC), sent for him to cure his sons, Mausolus and Pixodarus, of a dangerous illness, which he undertook to do upon condition that Hecatomnus should cease from waging war against his country.

He wrote some medical works, of which nothing but the titles of two remain: Book for Doctors (Ἰατρικὸν βιβλίον) in 1 volume and On Prognoses (Περὶ προγνώσεων) in 2 volumes.

He was blamed by Erasistratus for his excessive severity in restricting the quantity of drink allowed to his patients. He is quoted by Plutarch and Aulus Gellius in the controversy that was maintained among some of the ancient physicians as to whether the drink passed down the windpipe or the gullet.
