= Aspasia the Physician =

Athenian physician

Aspasia was an ancient Greek medical writer known only from book 16 of Aetius of Amida's Tetrabiblion. She is cited eleven times by Aetius. John Scarborough suggests that Aspasia was a contemporary of Aetius and an expert in gynaecology and obstetrics.

Because Aspasia is not attested anywhere outside of the last book of Aetius, and because of the name Aspasia, which Rebecca Flemming says held "obvious appeal ... in a gynacological context", Flemming has argued that it should not be assumed that Aspasia was a real woman physician. Steven Muir and Laurence Totelin suggest that the name, evoking Pericles' lover, might have been chosen to lend authority to obstetric and gynacological material. However, Holt Parker questions this view. He observes that Aspasia was a common name, and argues that there are other women whose names would have been more suitable to invoke than Pericles' Aspasia, such as Socrates' mother Phaenarete, said by Socrates to have been a midwife. He further notes that male medical writers with medically-related names, such as Asclepius or Asclepiades, do not have their existence questioned on this basis.
