= Meges of Sidon =

Meges (Greek: Μέγης; 1st century BC) was an eminent surgeon born at Sidon in Phoenicia, who practised at Rome with great reputation and success, shortly before the time of Celsus, and therefore probably in the 1st century BC. He wrote some works which are highly praised and several times quoted by Celsus, but of which nothing remains. He is, perhaps, the same person who is quoted by Pliny, Galen, and Scribonius Largus. A Greek fragment by Meges is preserved by Oribasius.
