= Aelius Promotus =

Greek physician based in Alexandria

Aelius Promotus (Ancient Greek: Αίλιος Προμωτος) was an ancient physician of Alexandria, of whose personal history no particulars are known, and whose date is uncertain. He is supposed by Villoison to have lived after the time of Pompey the Great, that is, in the 1st century BC. By others he is considered to be much more ancient; yet other scholars place him as late as the second half of the 1st century AD. He is most probably the same person who is quoted by Galen simply by the name of Aelius. He wrote several Greek medical works, which are still to be found in manuscript in different libraries in Europe. The treatise On venomous beasts and poisonous drugs, attributed to Aelius, was first known through excerpts and for the first time published completely in 1995. His main work titled Δυναμερόν (Latin Medicinalium Formularum Collectio), was first published in its complete extension in 2002 by Daria Crismani. Two other of his works are quoted or mentioned by Hieronymus Mercurialis. And also by Schneider in his prefaces to Nicander's Theriaca, and Alexipharmaca.
