= Antipater (1st-century BC physician) =

Greek physician and author

Antipater (Ancient Greek: Ἀντίπατρος) was a Greek physician and author of a work titled On the Soul, of which the second book is quoted by the Scholiast on Homer, in which he said that the soul increased, diminished, and at last perished with the body; and which may very possibly be the work quoted by Diogenes Laërtius, and commonly attributed to Antipater of Tarsus.

If he is the physician who is said by Galen to have belonged to the Methodic school, he must have lived in or after the 1st century BC; and this date will agree very well with the fact of his being quoted by Andromachus, Scribonius Largus, and Caelius Aurelianus. His prescriptions are frequently quoted with approbation by Galen and Aetius, and the second book of his "Epistles" is mentioned by Caelius Aurelianus.
