= Theodorus Priscianus =

Fourth century Roman physician and author

Theodorus Priscianus (Greek: Θεόδωρος ὁ Πρισκιανός) was a physician at Constantinople during the fourth century, and the author of the Latin work Rerum Medicarum in four books.

== Career ==
Priscianus was a pupil of the physician Vindicianus, fixing the period of his life in the fourth century. He is said to have lived at the court of Constantinople, and to have obtained the dignity of Archiater. He belonged to the medical sect of the Empirici, but not without a certain mixture of the doctrines of the Methodici, and even of the Dogmatici.

== Works ==
The Rerum Medicarum Libri Quatuor, or "Medical Matters in Four Books", is sometimes attributed to a person named Octavius Horatianus. The first book treats of external diseases, the second of internal, the third of female diseases, and the fourth of physiology, etc. The author, in his preface, speaks against the learned and worthy disputes physicians held at the bedside of the patient, and against their reliance on foreign remedies in preference to indigenous ones.

It was first published in 1532, in a folio edition at Strasburg, and a quarto edition at Basel. Of these, the latter is more correct than the other, but not so complete, as the whole of the fourth book is wanting, and also several chapters of the first and second books. It also appeared in Kraut's Experimentarius Medicinae, Argent, folio, 1544, and in the Aldine Collection of Medici Antiqui Latini, 1547, folio, Venet. J. M. Bernhold published a new octavo edition in 1791, at Ansbach, but only printed a first volume that contained the first book and part of the second.

Priscianus is generally identified as the author of a short Latin work, entitled Diaeta sive de Rebus Salutaribus Liber, first published in 1533. fol. Argent., with Hildegardis Physica, and in a separate form in 1632. octavo. Hal. ed. G. E. Schreiner. The manuscripts and these editions of his work simply identify the author as Theodorus.

== Criticism ==
Of the Rerum Medicarum, Dr. William A. Greenhill writes, "Several of the medicines which Priscianus mentions are absurd and superstitious; the style and language of the work are bad; and altogether it is of little interest and value."

== Bibliography ==
- Dictionary of Greek and Roman Biography and Mythology, William Smith, ed., Little, Brown and Company, Boston (1849).
