= Sextus Placitus =

Ancient Roman physician

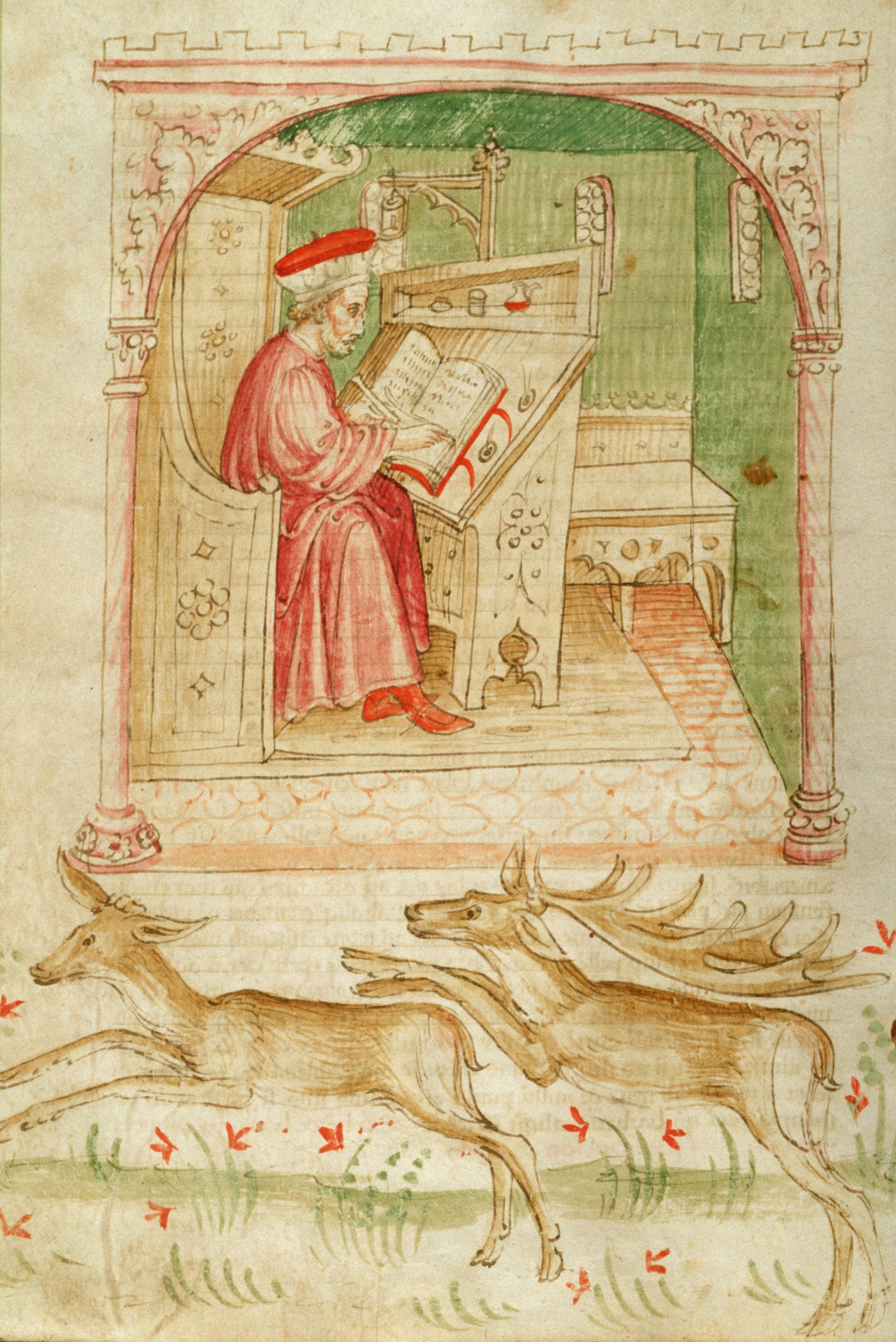
Sextus Placitus depicted in a manuscript of his book Medicinae ex animalibus. Lombardy, circa 1400.

Sextus Placitus of Papyra, (active ca. 370 CE), an ancient Roman physician, is best known for his Libri medicinae Sexti Placiti Papyriensis ex animalibus pecoribus et bestiis vel avibus Concordantiae.

Placitus wrote fanciful descriptions of medicines derived from animals, and other sources. For example, he recommended such remedies as consuming cooked puppy to relieve colic, and breaking a fever by cutting a splinter from the door that a eunuch has just passed through.

== Works ==
- Libri medicinae Sexti Placiti Papyriensis ex animalibus pecoribus et bestiis vel avibus Concordantiae.

== See also ==
- Ancient Roman medicine
- Culture of ancient Rome
