= Antipater (2nd-century physician) =

Antipater (Ancient Greek: Ἀντίπατρος) was a Greek physician and contemporary of Galen at Rome in the 2nd century AD. Galen gave an account of Antipater's death and the morbid symptoms that preceded it.
