= Antiphanes of Delos =

Greek physician

Antiphanes of Delos (Greek: Ἀντιφάνης) was a Greek physician. He has been quoted by Caelius Aurelianus and Galen, and must therefore have lived some time in or before the 2nd century AD. He is mentioned by Clement of Alexandria as having said "the sole cause of diseases in man was the too great variety of his food."
