= Athenaeus of Attalia =

1st-century AD Greek physician

Athenaeus of Attalia (Ancient Greek: Ἀθήναιος) (1st century AD), was a physician, and the founder of the Pneumatic school of medicine. He was born in Cilicia, at Attalia according to Galen, or at Tarsus according to Caelius Aurelianus. He was the tutor to Theodorus, and appears to have practised medicine at Rome with great success.

Athenaeus appears to have written extensively, as the twenty-fourth volume of one of his works is quoted by Galen, and the twenty-ninth by Oribasius. Nothing, however, remains but the titles (his chief work being Περὶ βοηθημάτων lit. On Remedies), and some fragments preserved by Oribasius.

Galen gives the following report:

Athenaeus of Attaleia ... founded the medical school known as the Pneumatists. It suits his doctrine to speak of a containing cause in illness since he bases himself upon the Stoics and he was a pupil and disciple of Posidonius ... Athenaeus’ three types are as follows: the first consists of containing causes, the second of preceding causes, and the third of the matter of antecedent causes: for this is what they call everything external to the body which harms it and produces disease in it. If what is produced in the body belongs to the class of what causes disease, then, while it has not actually brought the disease about, it is called the preceding cause. Alterations are produced in the natural pneuma by these [i.e., preceding] causes together with those which are external [i.e., antecedent causes], and with the body moistened or desiccated, chilled or heated, these are said to be the containing causes of diseases. (Galen, On Sustaining Causes 2.1–4)
