= Pneuma =

Concept in Ancient Greek philosophy

Pneuma (Ancient Greek: πνεῦμα, romanized: pneûma) is an ancient Greek word for "breath", and in a religious context for "spirit". It has various technical meanings for medical writers and philosophers of classical antiquity, particularly in regard to physiology, and is also used in Greek translations of ruach רוח in the Hebrew Bible, and in the Greek New Testament.

In classical philosophy, it is distinguishable from psyche (Ancient Greek: ψυχή, romanized: psūkhḗ), which originally meant "breath of life", but is regularly translated as "spirit" or most often "soul".

== Presocratics ==
Pneuma, "air in motion, breath, wind", is equivalent in the material monism of Anaximenes to aer (ἀήρ, "air") as the element from which all else originated. This usage is the earliest extant occurrence of the term in philosophy. A quotation from Anaximenes observes that "just as our soul (psyche), being air (aer), holds us together, so do breath (pneuma) and air (aer) encompass the whole world." In this early usage, aer and pneuma are synonymous.

== Aristotle ==
The "connate pneuma" (symphuton pneuma) of Aristotle is the warm mobile "air" that plays many roles in Aristotle's biological texts. It is in sperm and is responsible for transmitting the capacity for locomotion and certain sensations to the offspring. These movements derive from the soul of the parent and are embodied by the pneuma as a material substance in semen.

Pneuma is necessary for life, and as in medical theory is involved with preserving the "vital heat," but some commentators think the Aristotelian pneuma is less precisely and thoroughly defined than that of the Stoics.

Movement of Animals explains the activity of desire (orexis) as an expansion and contraction of pneuma. The innate spirit (symphuton pneuma) is the power of the soul (psychiken) to be mobile (kinetikon) and exercise strength.

All animals "possess an inborn spirit (pneuma sumphuton) and exercise their strength in virtue of it." (703a10). This inborn spirit is used to explain desire (orexis), which is classified as the "cental origin (to meson), which moves by being itself moved." (703a5-6). Aristotle furthers this idea of being a "middle cause" by furnishing the metaphor of the movement of the elbow, as it relates to the immobility of the shoulder (703a13). The inborn pneuma is, likewise, tethered to the soul, or as he says here, tēn arche tēn psuchikēn, "the origin of the soul," the soul as the center of causality. This "spirit" is not the soul itself but a limb of the soul that helps it move.

The inborn spirit causes movement in the body by expanding and contracting. Each of these implies not only a movement but also a change in the degree of power and strength of the animal. "when it contracts it is without force, and one and the same cause gives it force and enables it to thrust." (703a23).

He also explained this in On Sleeping and Waking "In another place it has been laid down that sense-perception originates in the same part of an animal's body as movement does...In sanguineous animals this is the region about the heart; for all sanguineous animals possess a heart, and both movement and the dominant sense-perception originate there. As for movement, it is clear that breathing and in general the process of cooling takes its rise here, and that nature has supplied both breathing and the power of cooling by moisture with a view to the conservation of the heat in that part. We will discuss this later on. In bloodless animals and insects and creatures which do not respire, the naturally inherent breath is seen expanding and contraction in the part which corresponds to the heart in other animals." 456a1–13.

"Since it is impossible to make any movement, or do any action without strength, and the holding of the breath produces strength" 456a17.

Pneuma also played an important role in respiration. Respiration is the process by which breathing helps to cool and moderate the inner vital heat (thermotēta psychikēs) held in the heart.

"We have said before that life and the possession of heat depend upon some degree of heat; for digestion, by which animals assimilate their food, cannot take place apart from the soul and heat; for all food is rendered digestible by fire." 474a25–27.

Aristotle explains that if there is an excess of heat created in the heart the animal will "burn out" by excessively consuming the power sustaining its life (474b10–24). Its heat must be kindled (474b13) and in order to preserve (sōtērias) life, a cooling must take place (katapsyxis) (474b23).

== Stoicism ==
In Stoic philosophy, pneuma is the concept of the "breath of life," a mixture of the elements air (in motion) and fire (as warmth). For the Stoics, pneuma is the active, generative principle that organizes both the individual and the cosmos. In its highest form, pneuma constitutes the human soul (psychê), which is a fragment of the pneuma that is the soul of the Deity. As a force that structures matter, it exists even in inanimate objects. In the foreword to his 1964 translation of Marcus Aurelius' Meditations, Maxwell Staniforth writes:

Cleanthes, wishing to give more explicit meaning to Zeno's 'creative fire', had been the first to hit upon the term pneuma, or 'spirit', to describe it. Like fire, this intelligent 'spirit' was imagined as a tenuous substance akin to a current of air or breath, but essentially possessing the quality of warmth; it was immanent in the universe as God, and in man as the soul and life-giving principle.

In the Stoic universe, everything consists of matter and pneuma. There are three grades or kinds of pneuma, depending on their proportion of fire and air.

- The pneuma of state or tension (tonos). This unifying and shaping pneuma provides stability or cohesion (hexis) to things; it is a force that exists even in objects such as a stone, log, or cup. The 4th-century Christian philosopher Nemesius attributes the power of pneuma in Stoic thought to its "tensile motion" (tonicê kinêsis); that is, the pneuma moves both outwards, producing quantity and quality, and at the same time inwards, providing unity and substance. An individual is defined by the equilibrium of its inner pneuma, which holds it together and also separates it from the world around it.
- The pneuma as life force. The vegetative pneuma enables growth (physis) and distinguishes a thing as alive.
- The pneuma as soul. The pneuma in its most rarefied and fiery form serves as the animal soul (psychê); it pervades the organism, governs its movements, and endows it with powers of perception and reproduction. This concept of pneuma is related to Aristotle's theory that the pneuma in sperm conveys the capacity for locomotion and for certain sensory perceptions to the offspring.

A fourth grade of pneuma may also be distinguished. This is the rational soul (logica psychê) of the mature human being, which grants the power of judgment.

In Stoic cosmology, the cosmos is a whole and single entity, a living thing with a soul of its own. Everything that exists depends on two first principles which can be neither created nor destroyed: matter, which is passive and inert, and the logos, or divine reason, which is active and organizing. The 3rd-century BC Stoic Chrysippus regarded pneuma as the vehicle of logos in structuring matter, both in animals and in the physical world. This divine pneuma that is the soul of the cosmos supplies the pneuma in its varying grades for everything in the world, a spherical continuum of matter held together by the orderly power of Zeus through the causality of the pneuma that pervades it.

Pneuma in its purest form can thus be difficult to distinguish from logos or the "constructive fire" (pur technikon) that drives the cyclical generation and destruction of the Stoic cosmos. When a cycle reaches its end in conflagration (ekpyrôsis), the cosmos becomes pure pneuma from which it regenerates itself.

== Christian philosophy ==
In his Introduction to the 1964 book Meditations, the Anglican priest Maxwell Staniforth discussed the profound impact of Stoicism on Christianity. In particular:

Another Stoic concept which offered inspiration to the Church was that of 'divine Spirit'. Cleanthes, wishing to give more explicit meaning to Zeno's 'creative fire', had been the first to hit upon the term pneuma, or 'spirit', to describe it. Like fire, this intelligent 'spirit' was imagined as a tenuous substance akin to a current of air or breath, but essentially possessing the quality of warmth; it was immanent in the universe as God, and in man as the soul and life-giving principle. Clearly it is not a long step from this to the 'Holy Spirit' of Christian theology, the 'Lord and Giver of life', visibly manifested as tongues of fire at Pentecost and ever since associated – in the Christian as in the Stoic mind – with the ideas of vital fire and beneficient warmth.

Philo, a 1st-century Hellenistic Jewish philosopher, commented on the use of Πνοή, rather than πνευμα, in the Septuagint translation of Genesis 2:7. Philo explains that, in his view, pneuma is for the light breathing of human men while the stronger pnoē was used for the divine Spirit. Pneuma is a common word for "spirit" in the Septuagint and the Greek New Testament. At John 3:5, for example, pneuma is the Greek word translated into English as "spirit": "Verily, verily, I say unto thee, Except a man be born of water and of the Spirit (pneuma), he cannot enter into the kingdom of God." In some translations such as the King James version, however, pneuma is then translated as "wind" in verse eight, followed by the rendering "Spirit": "The wind (pneuma) bloweth where it listeth, and thou hearest the sound thereof, but canst not tell whence it cometh, and whither it goeth: so is every one that is born of the Spirit (pneuma)."

== Ancient Greek medical theory ==
In ancient Greek medicine, pneuma is the form of circulating air necessary for the systemic functioning of vital organs. It is the material that sustains consciousness in a body. According to Diocles and Praxagoras, the psychic pneuma mediates between the heart – regarded as the seat of Mind in some physiological theories of ancient medicine – and the brain.

The disciples of Hippocrates explained the maintenance of vital heat to be the function of the breath within the organism. Around 300 BC, Praxagoras discovered the distinction between the arteries and the veins, although close studies of vascular anatomy had been ongoing since at least Diogenes of Apollonia. In the corpse, arteries are empty; hence, in the light of these preconceptions they were declared to be vessels for conveying pneuma to the different parts of the body. A generation afterwards, Erasistratus made this the basis of a new theory of diseases and their treatment. The pneuma, inhaled from the outside air, rushes through the arteries till it reaches the various centres, especially the brain and the heart, and there causes thought and organic movement.

=== Pneumatic school ===
The Pneumatic school of medicine (Pneumatics, or Pneumatici, Greek: Πνευματικοί) was an ancient school of medicine in ancient Greece and Rome. It was founded in Rome by Athenaeus of Cilicia, in the 1st century AD.

The Roman era was a time when the Methodic school had enjoyed its greatest reputation, from which the Pneumatic school differed principally in that, instead of the mixture of primitive atoms, they adopted an active principle of immaterial nature, pneuma, or spirit. This principle was the cause of health and disease. Galen is the principal source for learning about the doctrines of the Pneumatic school's founder.

Plato and Aristotle had already laid the foundations of the doctrine of pneuma, for which, Aristotle was the first to describe the ways in which the pneuma is introduced into the body and the sanguineous system. The Stoics developed the theory even more and applied it to the functions of the body. Erasistratus and his successors had made the pneuma act a great part in health and disease. Thus, the theory of the pneuma was not a new one. The Methodic school, however, appears to have done away with much of the theory. The Pneumatic school, in choosing to oppose the Methodic school, adopted a firmly established principle, and chose the pneuma principle of the Stoics.

They thought that logic was indispensable to medicine, and Galen tells us that the Pneumatic school would rather have betrayed their country than renounce their opinions. Athenaeus had also adopted much of the doctrines of the Peripatetics, and besides the doctrine of the pneuma, he developed the theory of the elements much more than the Methodic school had done. He recognised in the four elements the positive qualities (poiotes) of the animal body; but he often regarded them as real substances, and gave to the whole of them the name of Nature of Man. Although the Pneumatici attributed the majority of diseases to the pneuma, they nevertheless paid attention to the mixture of the elements. The union of heat and moisture was the most suitable for the preservation of health. Heat and dryness give rise to acute diseases, cold and moisture produce phlegmatic affections, cold and dryness give rise to melancholy. Everything dries up and becomes cold at the approach of death.

== See also ==
- Pneuma akatharton, unclean spirit
- Pneuma journal, subtitled The Journal of the Society for Pentecostal Studies
- Pneuma (song)
- Pneumatic (Gnosticism)
- Pneumatology
- Holy Spirit
- Prana
- Qi
- Rūḥ
- Evaporation
