= Surgery in ancient Rome =

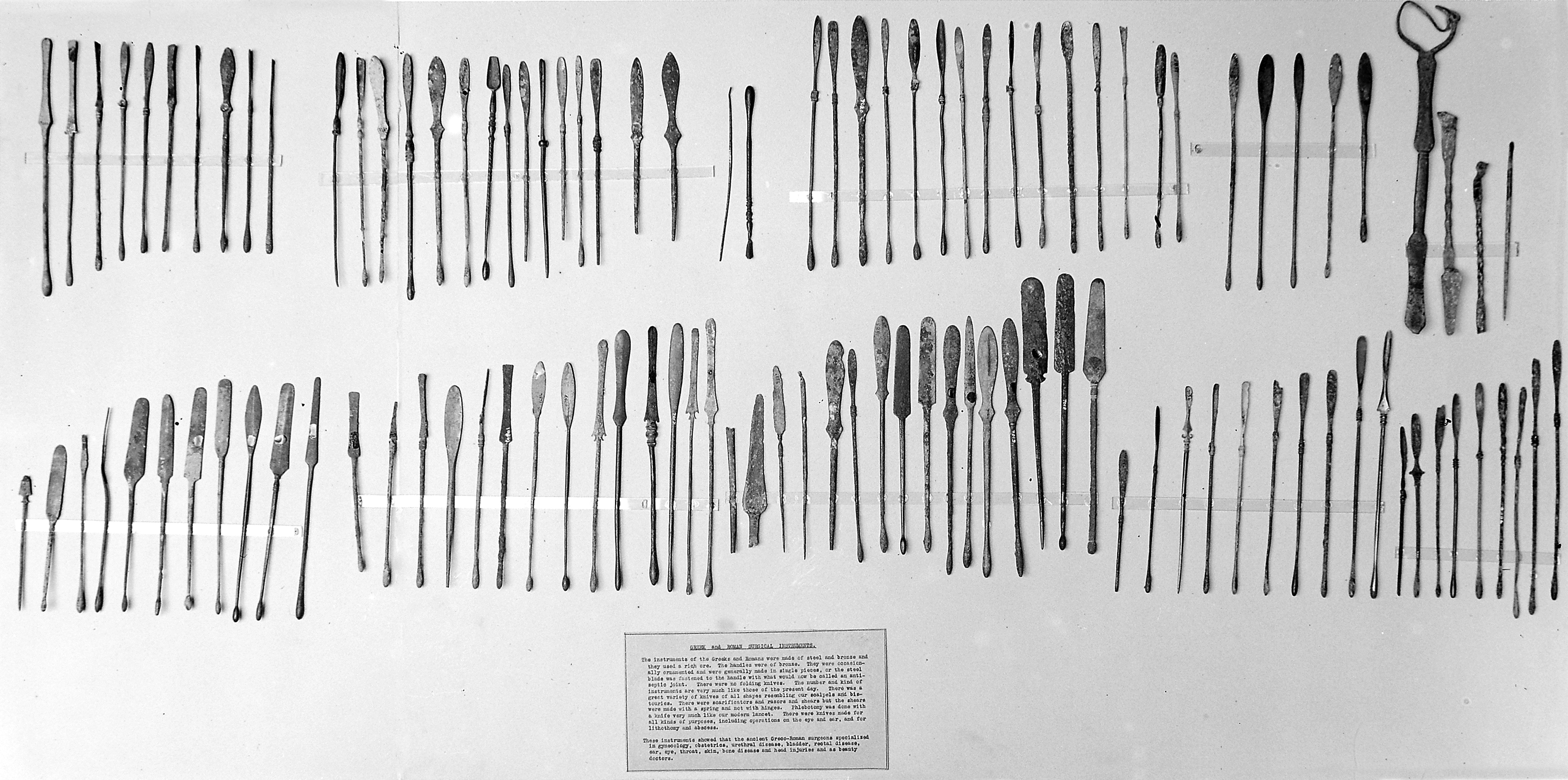
Roman surgical tools from the Wellcome Collection

Ancient Roman surgical practices developed from Greek techniques. Roman surgeons and doctors usually learned through apprenticeships or studying. Ancient Roman doctors such as Galen and Celsus described Roman surgical techniques in their medical literature, such as De Medicina. These methods encompassed modern oral surgery, cosmetic surgery, sutures, ligatures, amputations, tonsillectomies, mastectomies, cataract surgeries, lithotomies, hernia repair, gynecology, neurosurgery, and others. Surgery was a rare practice, as it was dangerous and often had fatal results. To perform these procedures, they used tools such as specula, catheters, enemas, bone levers, osteotomes, phlebotomes, probes, curettes, bone drills, bone forceps, cupping vessels, knives, scalpels, scissors, and spathas.

== History ==
Roman medical practices, including surgery, were borrowed from the Greeks, with many Roman surgeons coming from Greece. In the 2nd century CE, Galen, a Greek physician advanced Roman surgical knowledge by combining Greek and Roman medical knowledge.

Aulus Cornelius Celsus was a Roman encyclopedist notable for his work De Medicina. The text describes operations such as tonsillectomies and cataract surgery. Alongside these surgeons and doctors, Soranus of Ephesus introduced technology such as the birthing chair.

Surgeons were attracted to ancient Rome due to the potential for success and wealth. Doctors learned through private courses from other doctors, their relatives, in the city of Alexandria, or through self-teaching.

Charlatans and malpractice were common in ancient Rome, as any individual, regardless of their training or qualifications could practice medicine. This resulted in the general public becoming distrustful of doctors. Higher-quality surgeons often served the upper classes.

According to Celsus the perfect surgeon would be a younger man with strong and steady hands, sharp eyes, a strong spirit, and a strong sense of empathy and compassion. Surgery was rare in ancient Rome, it was rare for a patient to recover, and the procedure was dangerous. Most surgical procedures were limited to skin lacerations or amputations.

== Tools ==
=== Cupping vessels ===
Cupping vessels were round suction cups usually made of bronze or horns. They were made of different materials and had different designs and purposes. Bronze vessels were also used. They usually contained burning lint and were closed at one end and open at the other. Horn cups had small foramens at the ends and cavities closed off with wax. Cups had holes that were placed over injured areas and sweat glands. Following this, the tool would be used to draw out pus and "vicious humor." Cupping vessels were also used to aid bloodletting. First, heat was applied to the area to warm it up. Then, the skin was cut with a scalpel, following this, the cup would be fastened to the area to draw blood. Larger cupping devices were used for larger parts of the body, such as the back. Smaller cups were used for smaller parts of the body, such as the arms or the neck.

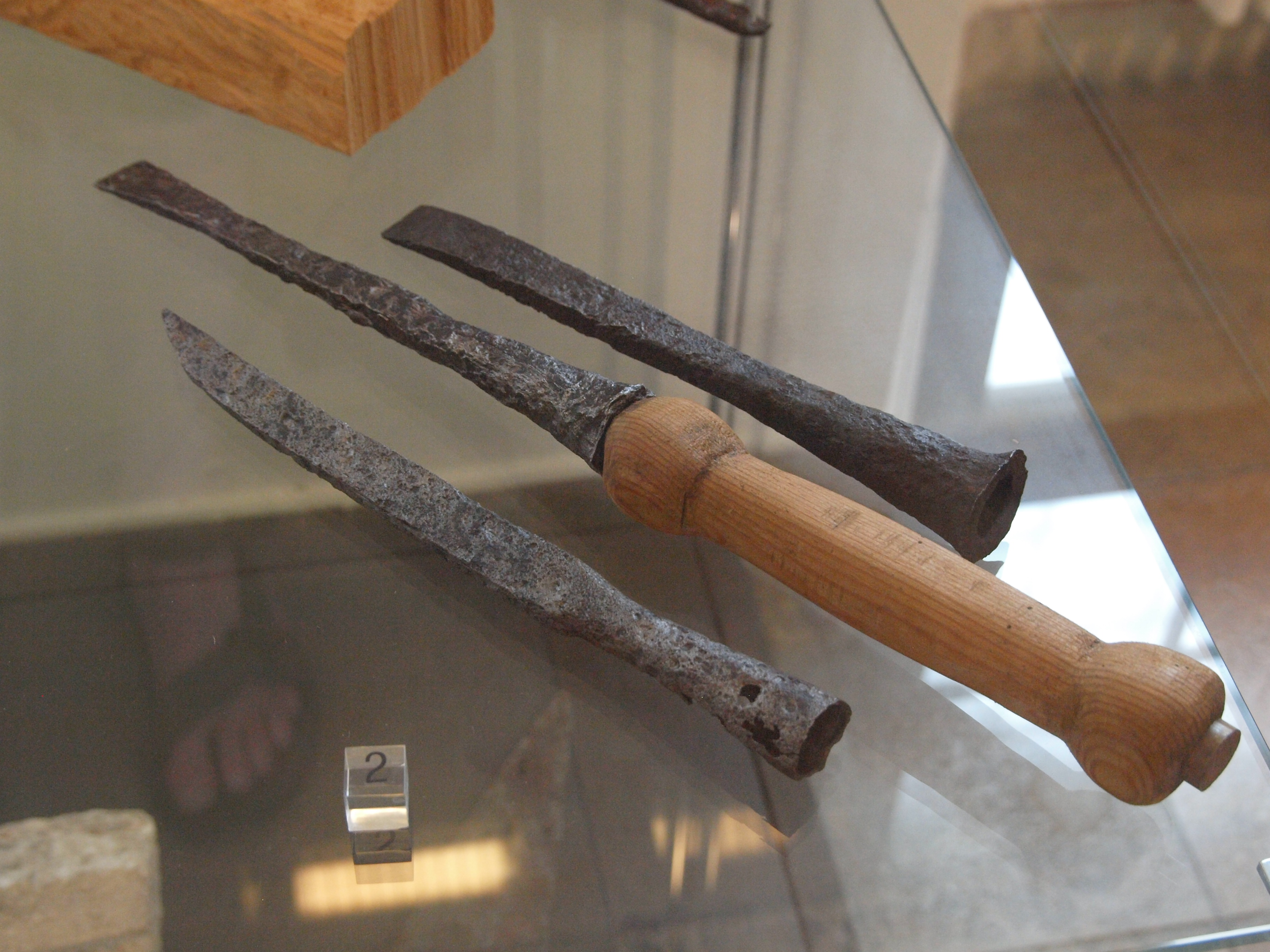
Ancient Roman chisel

=== Chisels and raspatories ===
Raspatories, also called rugines, were made of a blade fixed to a shaft at a right angle. They were used to treat bone fractures. In this procedure, the wound was filled with black ointment, then a linen rag filled with oil, and finally, it was used to scrape the bones. They would make incisions into and remove the skin to hold it or the bones in place. These tools were made of steel and covered in spiral decorations. Chisels were used during surgeries on teeth or bones. One kind of chisel, known as the lenticular, was used in neurosurgery. It was made of a rounded smooth knob, which was inserted into the open cranium or meninges. Hammers and blocks would be used alongside the chisels. To amputate a limb, it was placed on a block, then a chisel would be used to cut it off. Lithorites were kinds of chisels designed to remove calculus from the bladder. They would be struck through the calculus, eventually breaking it.

=== Drills and levers ===
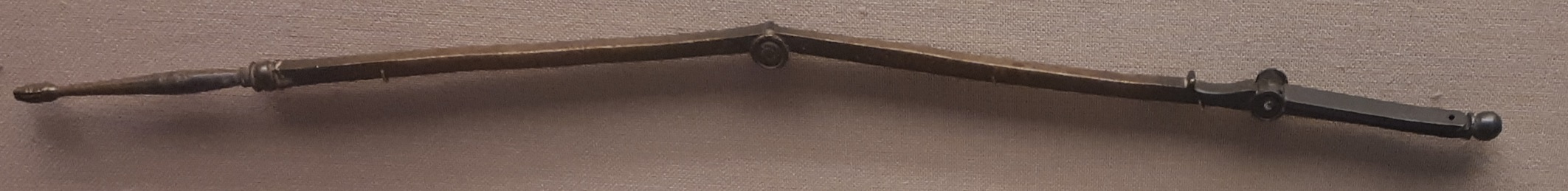
Folding handle for a Roman surgical drill

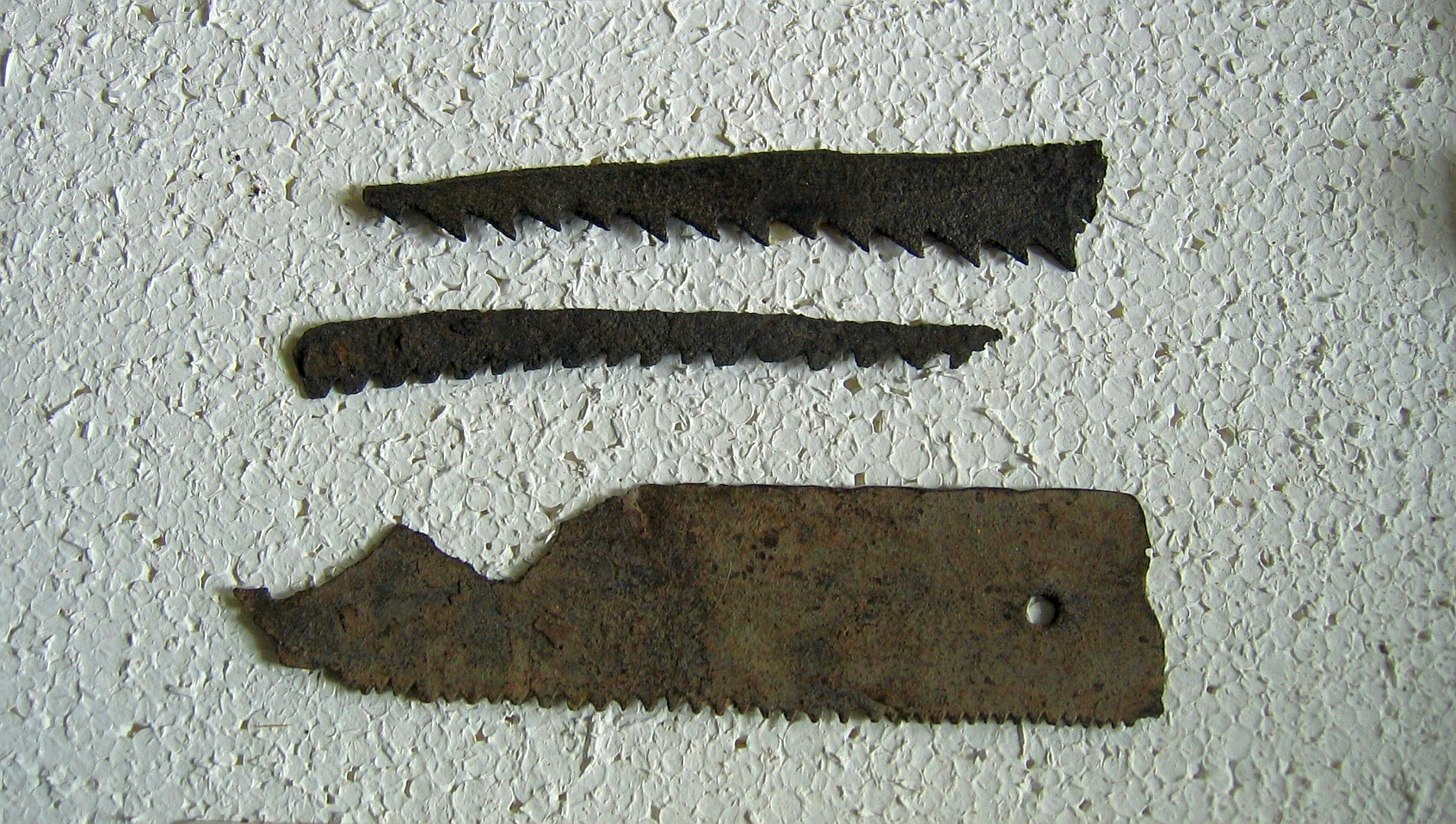
Ancient Roman sawblades

In ancient Rome, there were two kinds of surgical drills. One type was driven by a leather cord, the other type used a guard and a collar. This was designed to stop the instrument from penetrating too deeply into the bone. It was thought that this would minimize the risk of damage to the brain and meninges. Drills would also be frequently dipped in water to reduce heat, which was supposed to limit the danger of the surgery. The primary purpose of a drill was to remove large diseased portions of skulls. For example, drills were used to remove weapons lodged into the skull. Small drills were used to perforate the nasal bone. Which would create a "passage for the fluid or matter to the nose," thus treating the fistula. Drills were shaped like wine corkscrews. Bone levers were ancient steel tools shaped like rods with flattened and curved tips resembling stone cutters. They were used to level fractures, extract teeth, and realign broken bones.

=== Saws and trephines ===
Saws were primarily used to cut through bone. In one procedure for treating gangrene, a band was used to retract the skin to prevent the saw from tearing through the flesh. Then the saw could amputate the infected limb. Trephines were in the form of a circular saw. Doctors believed it needed to be frequently removed from the skull and placed in cold water during an operation. This was designed to alleviate the "heat" in the "bone." Trephines were used to saw the bone to the meninges thus treating injuries to young people's heads.

=== Forceps ===
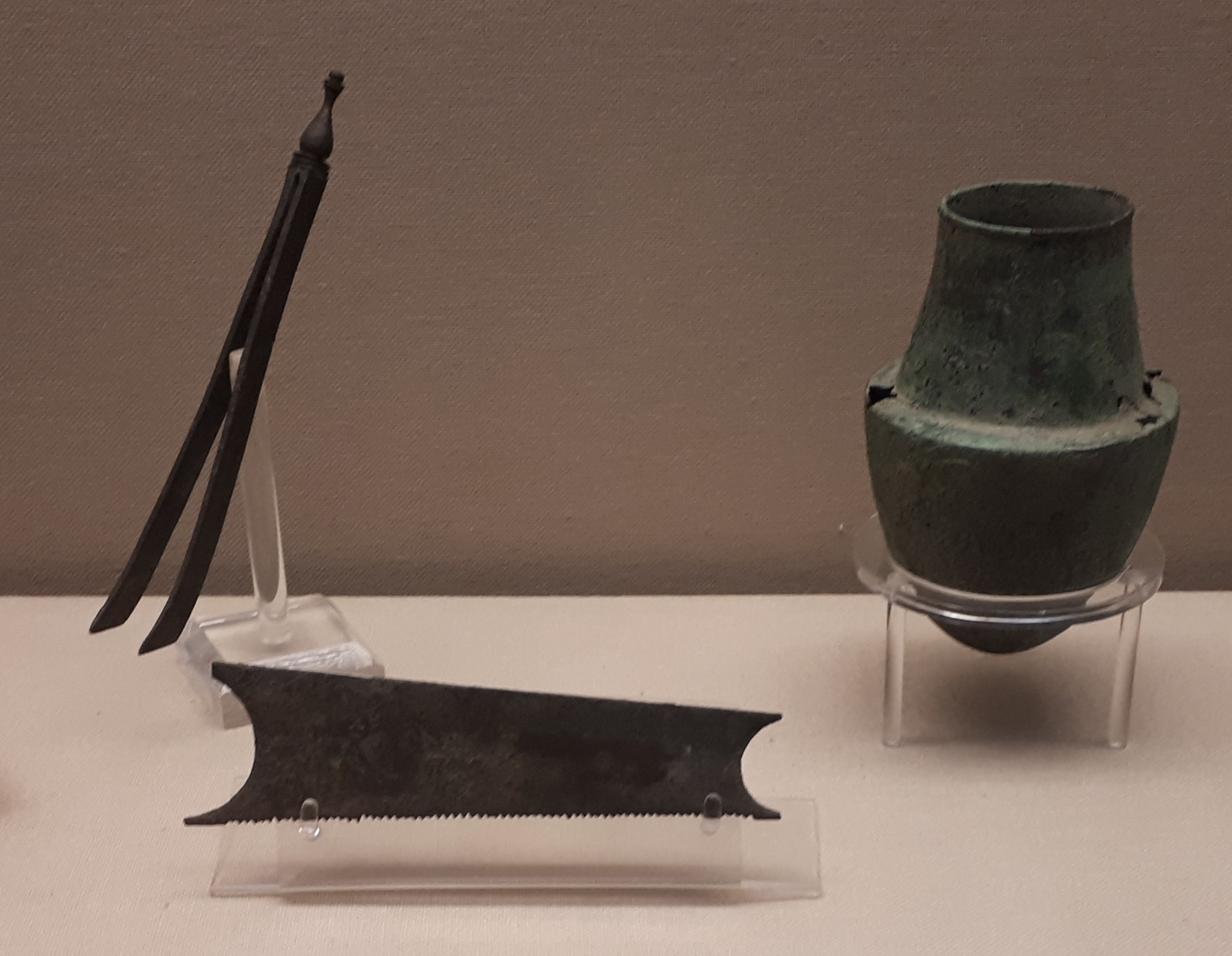
Roman bone forceps, bone saw, and a cupping vessel

Bone forceps were used to extract injured bones from the body. They were common tools, despite the Roman preference for using fingers instead of tools to fix bone injuries. Bone forceps were primarily used for instances in which pieces of bone were too small for fingers to remove. They would also cut off broken parts of the skull, or even drill through to the brain. Another kind of forceps, called Epilation forceps was primarily used to remove hair. Polypus forceps were used to remove polyps or tumors from the nose.

Tumor vulsellums, also known as Myzons, were toothed forceps that were used to remove tumors. In one procedure, they were used to "seize" the clitoris and cut off the tumor. To amputate the uvula, they used a tool known as uvula forceps to crush it and prevent bleeding. Following this, the vulsellum was used to twist it until a torsion was created. Then the uvula was cut off. Forceps could also be used to apply corrosive substances to the uvula to destroy it. These tools were made of two crossing branches which were fixed to the middle of the tool with a rivet.

Pharyngeal forceps were made of fishbones and they were used to remove entities from the pharynx. Varix extractors were a type of forceps used to extract varicose veins, which is a medical condition characterized by abnormally large veins. This procedure would be conducted by mapping out the locations of the afflicted veins, then the skin would be held and divided. Following this the extractor would hold and cut the skin, allowing for the veins to be removed. Tooth and stump forceps were used to extract teeth. This operation, and hence these tools were rarely employed due to how dangerous the operation was.

=== Probes and curettes ===
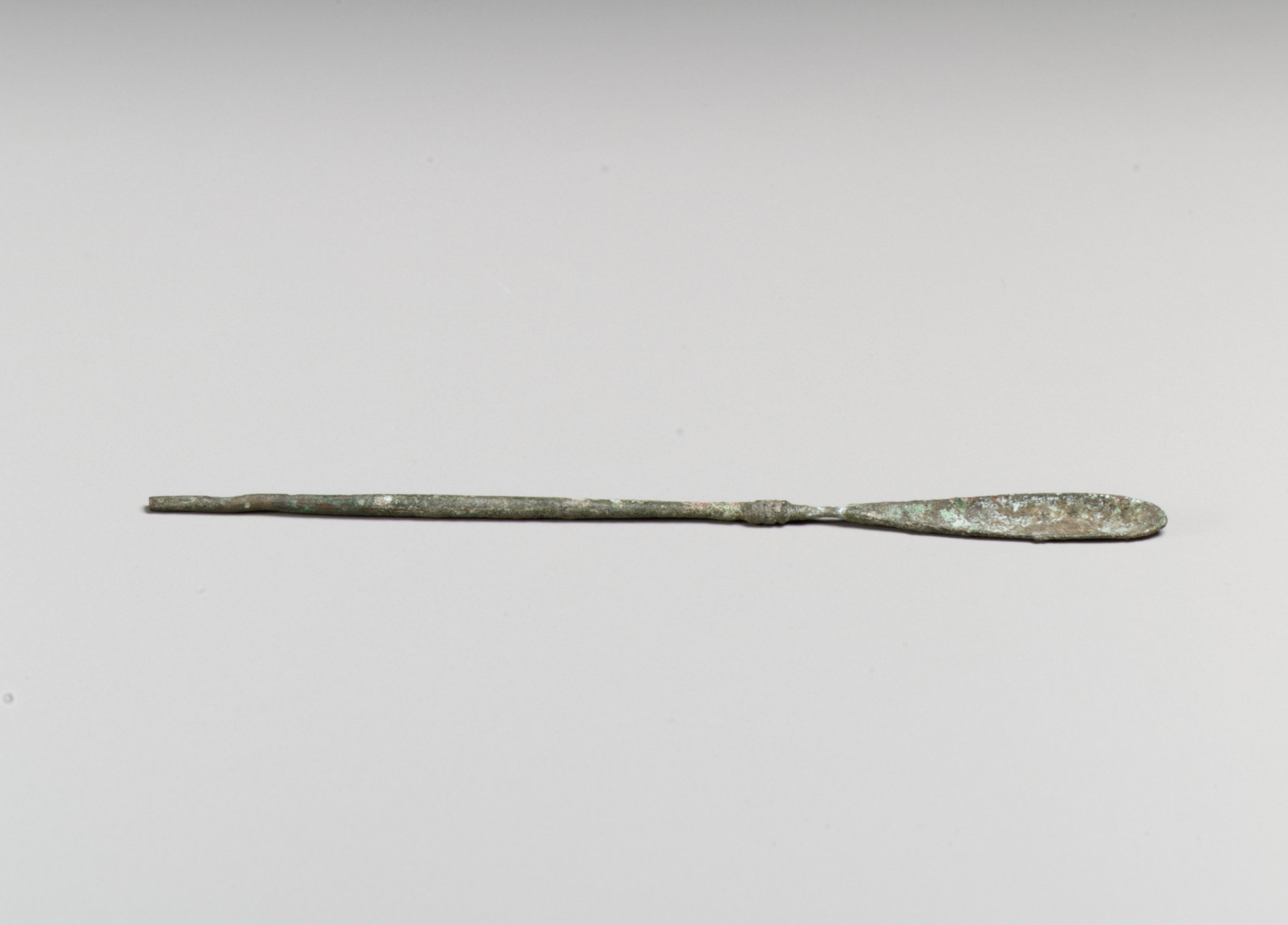
Ancient Roman curette

Probes and curettes were used to mix and apply medication to the skin or to lift tissue. When pushed into the fistula they were used to measure their dimensions. Roman probes had parts known as the nucleus. The nucleus was used primarily to apply medication. Sodium hydroxide was applied to the nucleus, which would then be used to burn out the eyelid. Wax was warmed on the nucleus of the probe, and then it was used to apply pomade to the face.

One type of probe consisted of a rod rounded off at one end. Another type was slender with enlarged ends. It was used to burn tissue and for organ transplantation. The largest probes were known as spathomeles. These tools were very common, with almost every ancient Roman medical writer mentioning them. Cyathiscomeles were types of spathomeles with large nuclei and a plain or fluted shaft overlaid with silver. Screw probes were designed to wrap around wool. Rasping probes were used to curette granular lids. Another kind of probe, called styli or styloid probes was used to puncture bladders. Grooved directors were instruments used to make incisions into the skin. These tools were usually made out of boxwood. Eyed probes were made from a rod of tin, and they were used to treat fistula. Bifurcated probes and retractors were used to extract weapons buried in the flesh.

Ear probes, also known as ear specilla, were made of a narrow scoop and an enlargement at each end. These tools had no nucleus or tip. They could also be used as curettes. Their primary purposes was cutting the interior of the chalazion and applying medications or liquids. The sharp end of the ear probe was used to treat fistula. A large ball of wood would be saturated with water and wrapped around the probe. Once squeezed, the liquid would drip onto the ear canal, which was thought to extract entities from the canal. A larger version of the ear probe, possibly with a slight enlargement at the ends, was used for treating wounds. This would be done through an incision behind the ear, following this the ear scoop was used to remove the objects. A common symptom of this procedure was dullness of hearing, often preceded by persistent headaches. Scabs and ulcers were other common side effects. To treat this, they were typically fomented with warm water, or verdigris drenched in honey, leek juice, and niter in mead. Following this, water was used to wash the ears. This tool could also be used as a curette.

=== Scalpels ===
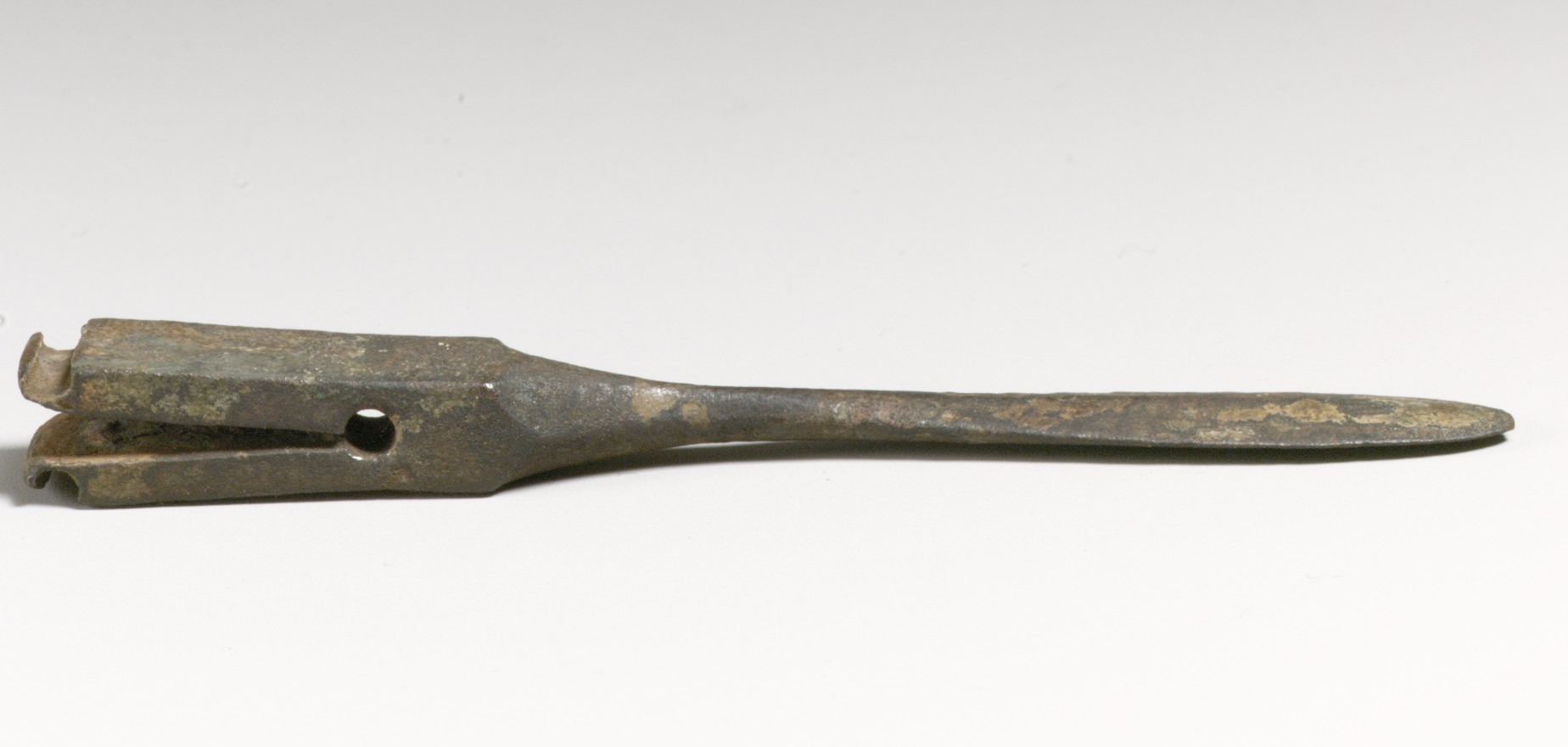
Bronze Roman scalpel from the 1st or 2nd century CE

Scalpels were tools made of a steel blade and a bronze handle. The bronze handle could be round, square, horizontal, or trapezoidal. Some scalpels had handles made of copper alloys with grips, dissectors, and an iron blade. This design was used to maximize efficiency. A slot was placed at one of the ends to connect to the steel blade. On the other end of the handle was connected to a leaf-shaped spatula. This spatula functioned as a blunt tool for dissection. A groove or a long and narrow indentation was located near the end of the handle. Alternatively, a cylindrical roll perforated with a hole could be used instead. Threads, wires, rolls, and perforations were used to attach the blade to the handle. Handles would have been decorated with moldings or inlay. The blade was made detachable to allow for cleaning and the usage of several blades. There were a variety of kinds of blades. One was straight, sharp, and pointed. Another was curved with sharp or blunt points. Blades were secured to the handles using simply sockets or key-hole shaped sockets using an alloy known as solder. The scalpel had great flexibility and performed a wide variety of functions, such as tearing away muscle and tissue during amputation, severing the umbilical cord, removing nasal polyps, mastectomies, making incisions, cutting through bone, and hernia repair.

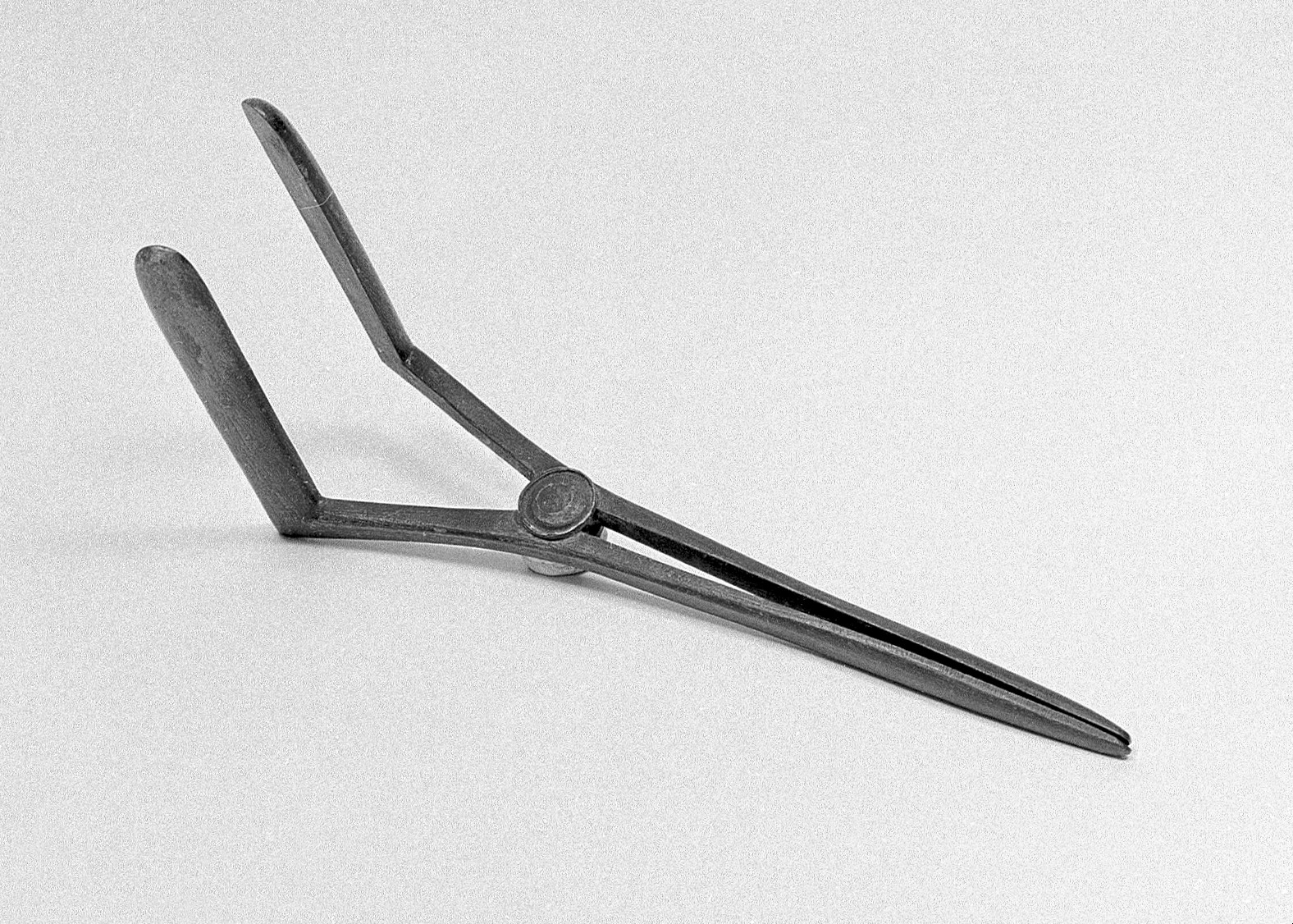
Roman rectal speculum

=== Specula ===
The rectal speculum also called the catopter was a dual-bladed surgical instrument in ancient Rome. Feminine specula were used to dilate vaginas. These specula were sized according to the age of the patient, and it was ensured that it was not larger than the urethra. To open the vagina, an assistant would turn a screw, expanding the blades, and therefore the vagina. Rectal specula were used to examine the bowels and its damaged parts. In the Republic these tools were made of copper and tin, by the Empire these tools began to be made of silver, as this material was less brittle. Specula also had rounded mirrors with handles. The surgeon, or another person, usually a slave would hold these mirrors.

=== Spoon of Diocles ===
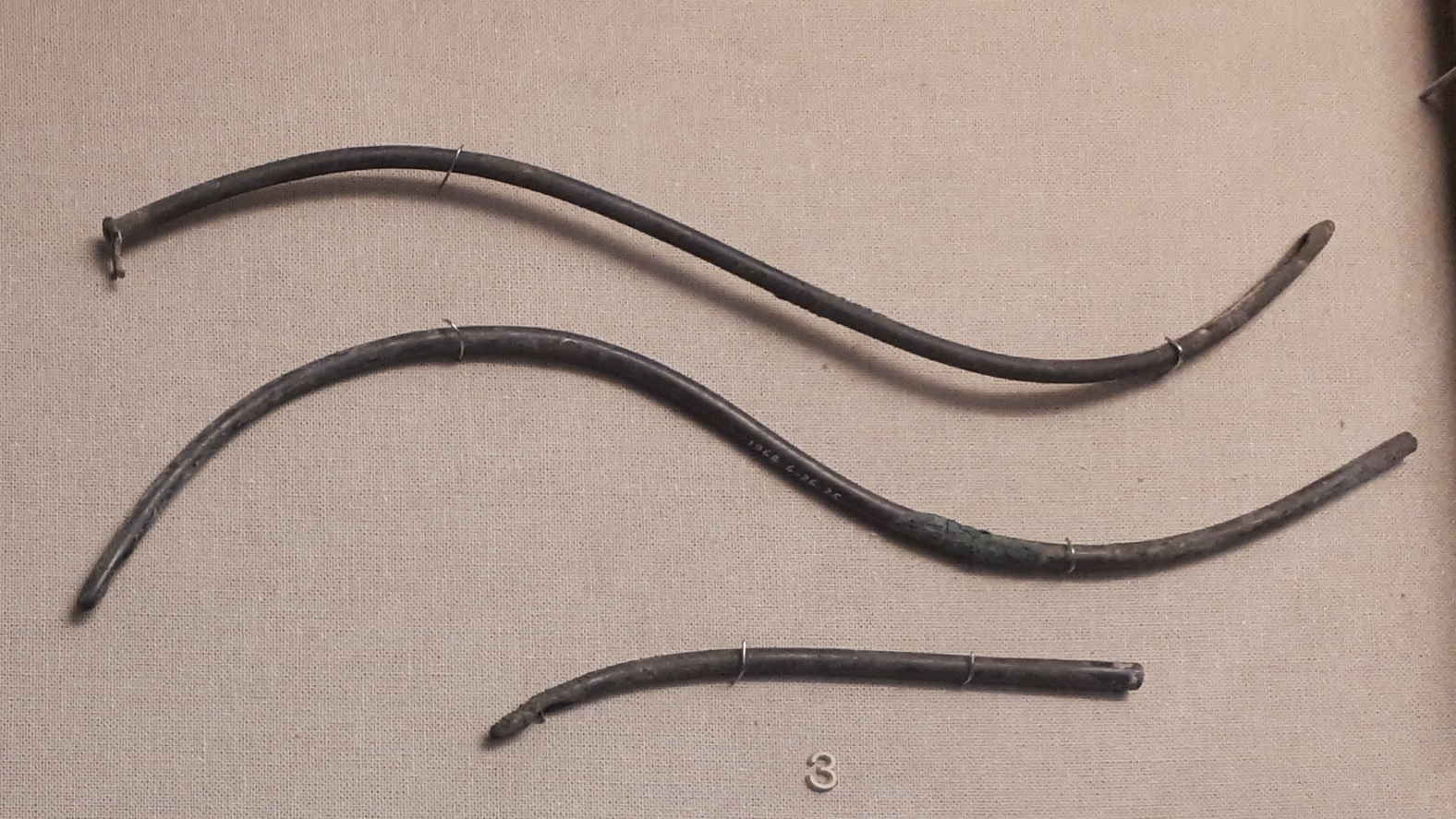
Ancient Roman catheters

The Spoon of Diocles also called the Dioclean kyathiskos was an ancient medical tool allegedly designed by Diocles of Carystus for removing arrowheads. It was a long bronze or iron tool with two hooks ending a curved scoop with a hole and a perforation. This tool would be pushed under and then between the arrow and the flesh. The head of the arrow would be caught in the hole, and the scoops would cover the barbs. Thus, when the arrow was dragged out the flesh would not be pierced. This instrument may have not existed. It is only mentioned by Celsus, who was a Roman physician, and no other writers.

=== Catheters ===
Catheters were also inserted into the bladder to treat urinary tract infections, ureteral stones, prostate cancer, bladder stones, sexually transmitted infections, painful urination, and difficulty urinating. The size and shape of the catheters depended on the gender and size of the individual. Bladders were drained through the urethra using an S-shaped catheter. Another procedure involved injecting a piece of thread with wool wrapped around it into the pipe of the tool. Then it was dipped in oil and used to make an incision into the perineum.

=== Strigils ===
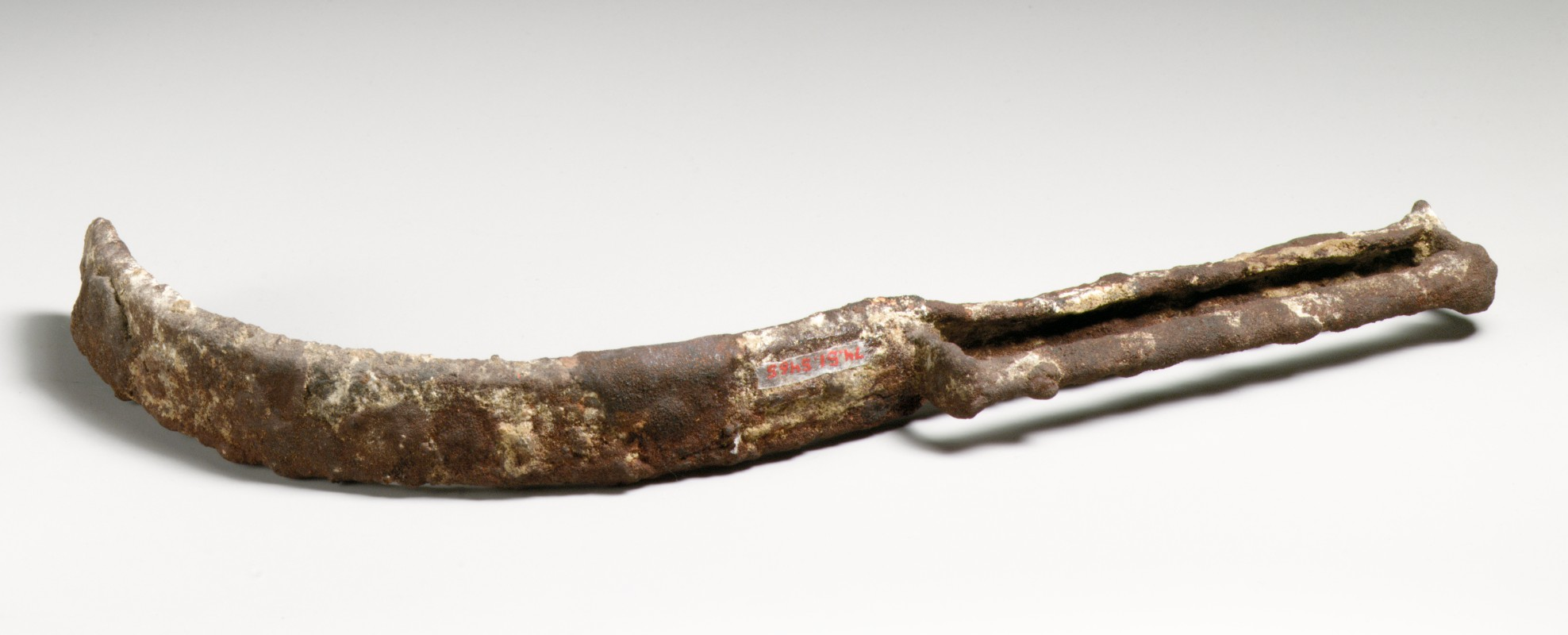
Ancient Roman strigil

This tool was used for scraping off dirt, perspiration, and oil to cleanse the body. The strigil was most commonly used by male athletes, although in other cultures such as the Etruscans it was used by a wider variety of people. They could also be used as burial goods and these tools are commonly depicted on works of art. It generally consisted of a curved metal blade, and a metal handle. Other materials that could be used included bronze, iron, and reeds.

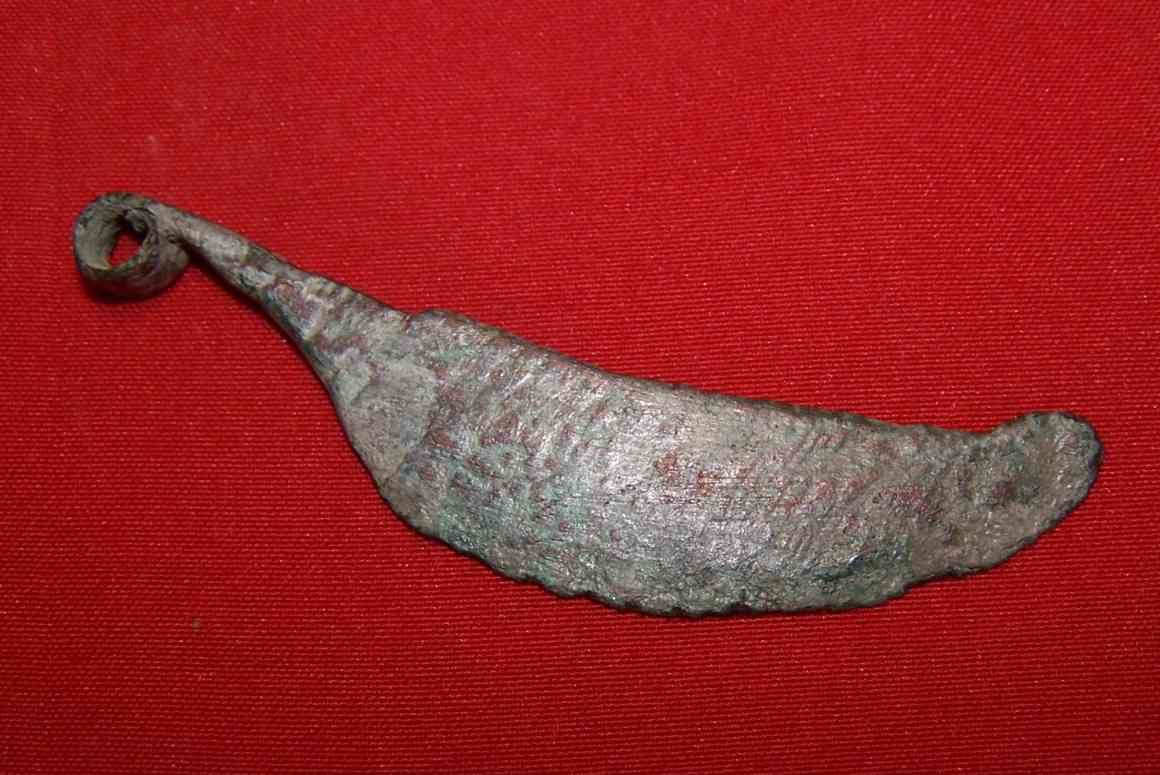
Ancient Roman bronze knife

=== Knives and needles ===
Another kind of knife, known as the polypus knife, was sharply pointed and shaped like a myrtle leaf. The knife was used to cut around tumors. To make an incision between the anus and the testicles a knife known as the lithotomy knife was used. The uvula knife was designed to perform operations on the throat and the uvula. There is little information on its shape and characteristics. Tonsil knives were used to remove the tonsil from mouths. To treat pterygium it was raised with a sharp hook, then a needle with a flaxen thread and horsehair was passed under it. The horsehair was used to saw off the pterygium and a scalpel was used to sever the base of it. Alternatively, the pterygium knife was a kind of knife used to cure pterygium. It was used to separate the adhesion to the sclerotic. This tool was narrow and sharply pointed.

=== Hooks ===
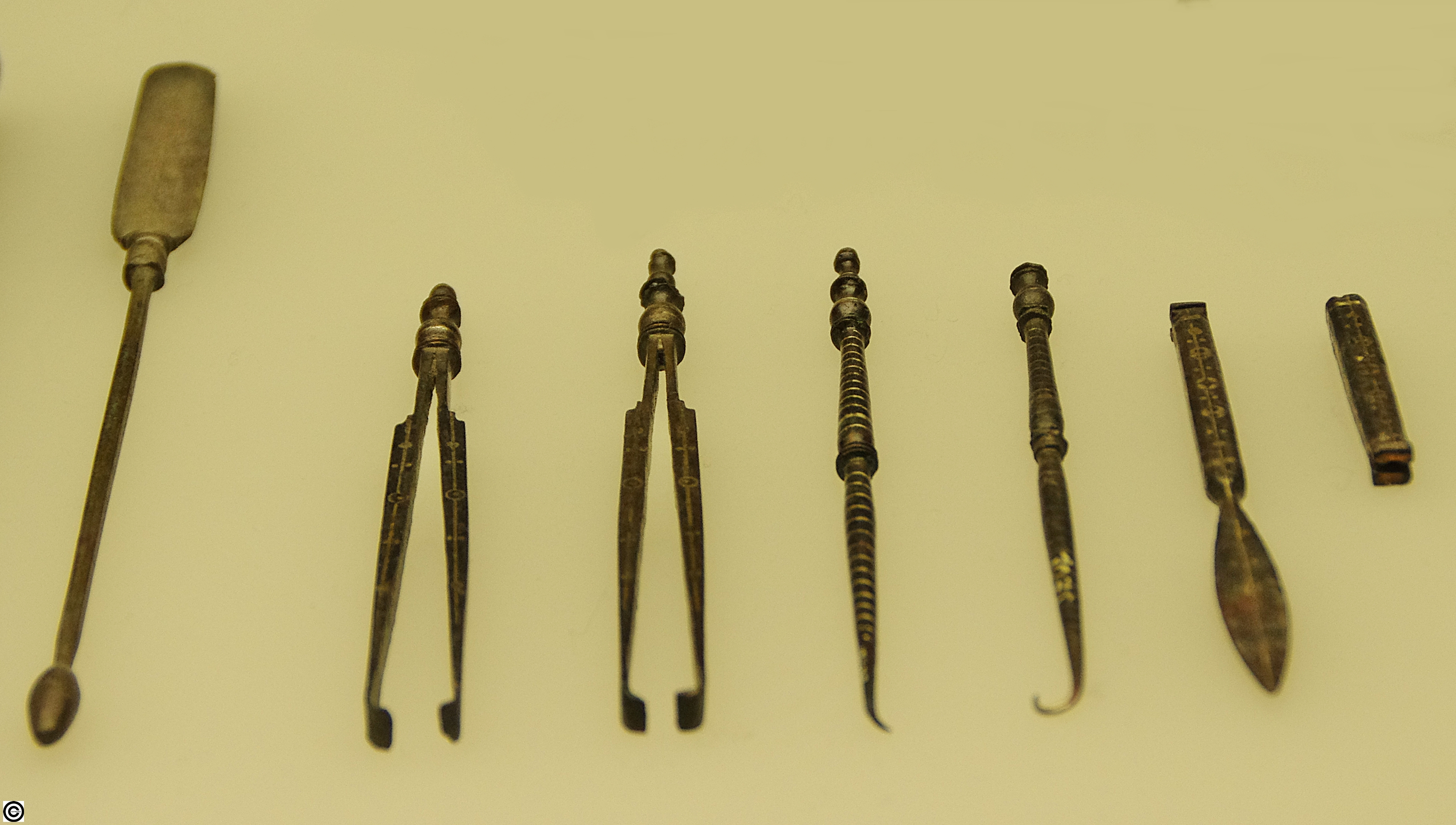
Roman surgical hooks

Obstetrical hooks may have existed in ancient Rome. These hooks were smooth and had short points, which were inserted into the ears, eyes, mouths, and forehead to extract children. Sharp hooks were used to hold open incisions, removing tissue, fixing and retracting wounds, raising blood vessels, removing tonsils, transfixing the pterygium, and for dissection. Blunt hooks were used to stretch adhesions near the eye and to pierce lips. Traction hooks were used to remove the fetus during especially tough labor. These hooks were smooth and round, with a short point. Once the head presented itself, the hook was inserted into the area and then used to extract the child. This procedure needed to execute carefully and gently. If it was not then there was an increased risk of death. It was common practice to use two hooks at once in these procedures. Another kind of hook, known as a decapitator, was used to decapitate the fetus during an abortion.

=== Other tools ===
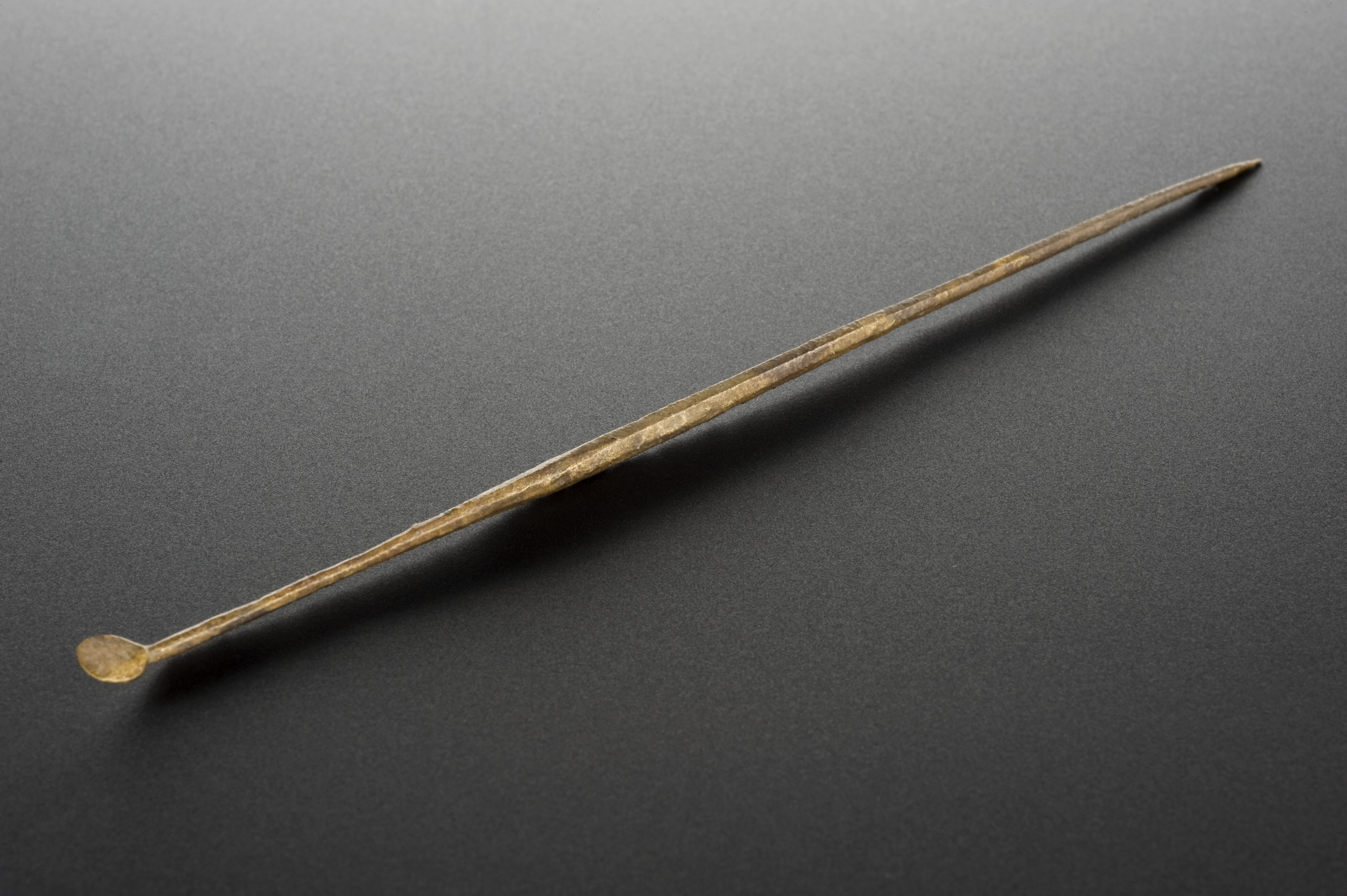
Ancient Roman cauterization probe

In ancient Rome saws could be used to amputate limbs for surgical purposes. Osteotomes were used to cut away at bone and remove membranes. Thigh tourniquets would stop bleeding and prevent the venom from spreading. Another common tool was bronze or iron cross-bladed scissors. During surgeries spatulas could also be used. Although they were primarily used to produce and apply medicine. Ancient Roman surgical tools called phlebotomes were used in operations known as phlebotomies. This tool is one of the most commonly mentioned tools in Ancient Roman medical literature. Despite this, there are no detailed descriptions of the phlebotome. This likely stems from the commonality of the instrument. Due to its popularity, doctors and writers assumed all readers would already be familiar with its appearance and usage. Hemispathions were used to divide the fistula. Syringes in ancient Rome had a variety of uses. Nasal syringes were made of two bronze or horn pipes that were used to inject liquids into the nostrils. Ear syringes were also common tools. They were used to remove unhealthy substances from the ears, and clean the ears, the bladder, the vagina, and the foreskin. Cannulae were used to heal ascites and empyema. This was done by using the bronze cannulae to make an incision into the abdomen and the peritoneum. Cauteries were common ancient surgical tools with a variety of types. Cautery knives were used to remove cancers such as malignant polyps as well as hydroceles. Cauteries could also remove eschars in the spleen, and hernias. It was also used to treat hemorrhoids, diseases of the liver, and trichiasis. The lithotomy scoop was a long and slender semicircular tool used to extract calculi. Enemas were usually made of long silver tubes with perforations attached to a pig's bladder. This bladder was filled with horse milk and closed with a cord. To treat dysentery, enemas were injected into the body's orifices, such as vaginas, bladders, or uteruses. In this operation, cannulae were inserted into the body. These cannulae had circles of small holes to prevent ascariasis, a disease caused by a parasitic roundworm.

== Techniques ==
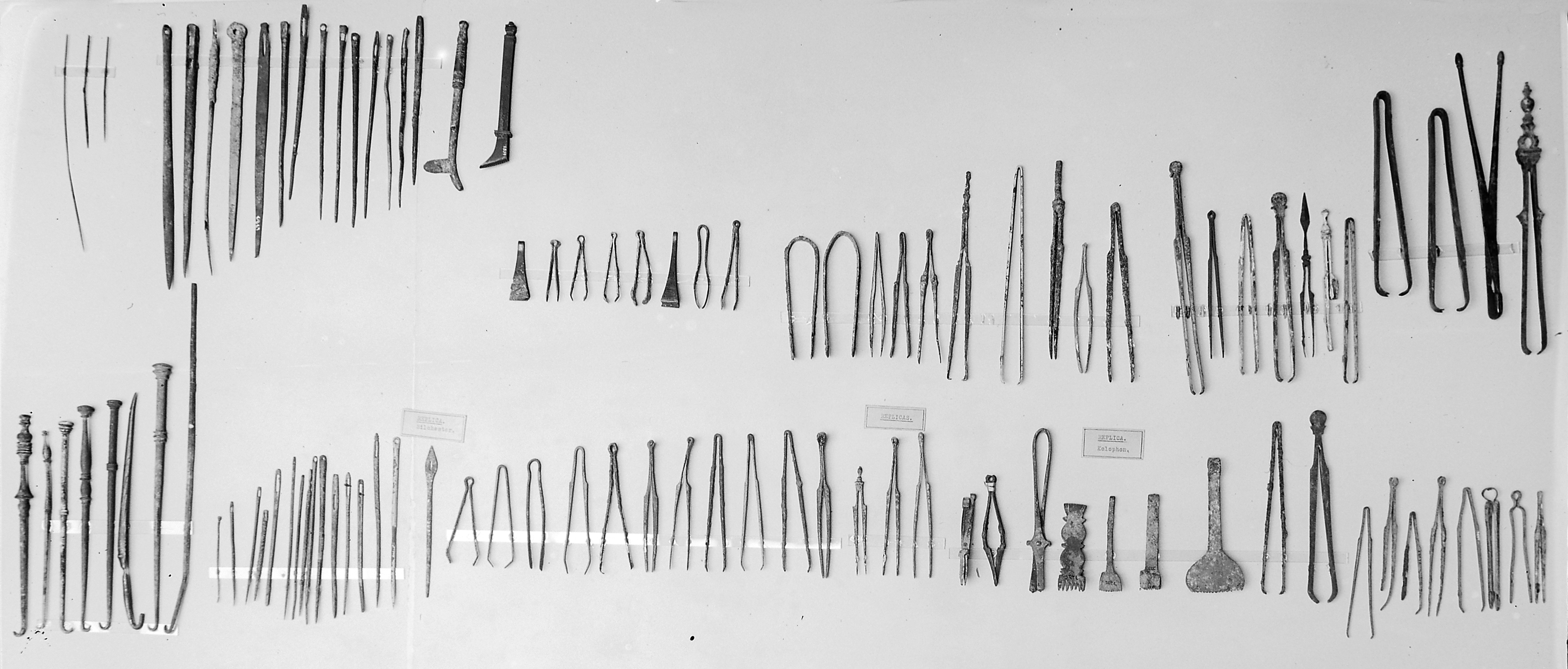
Ancient Roman surgical needles

=== Abortion ===
There were surgical procedures for abortion in ancient Rome, but they were rarely used, and most abortions were conducted using herbs or other drugs. When surgery was used, it involved the use of surgical instruments to penetrate the mother. Usually this procedure ended in the death of both the fetus and the mother. Soranus of Ephesus wrote that purging, carrying heavy weights, and the injection of olive oil into the vagina or uterus, were all procedures used to carry out abortions.

=== Amputations and dissections ===
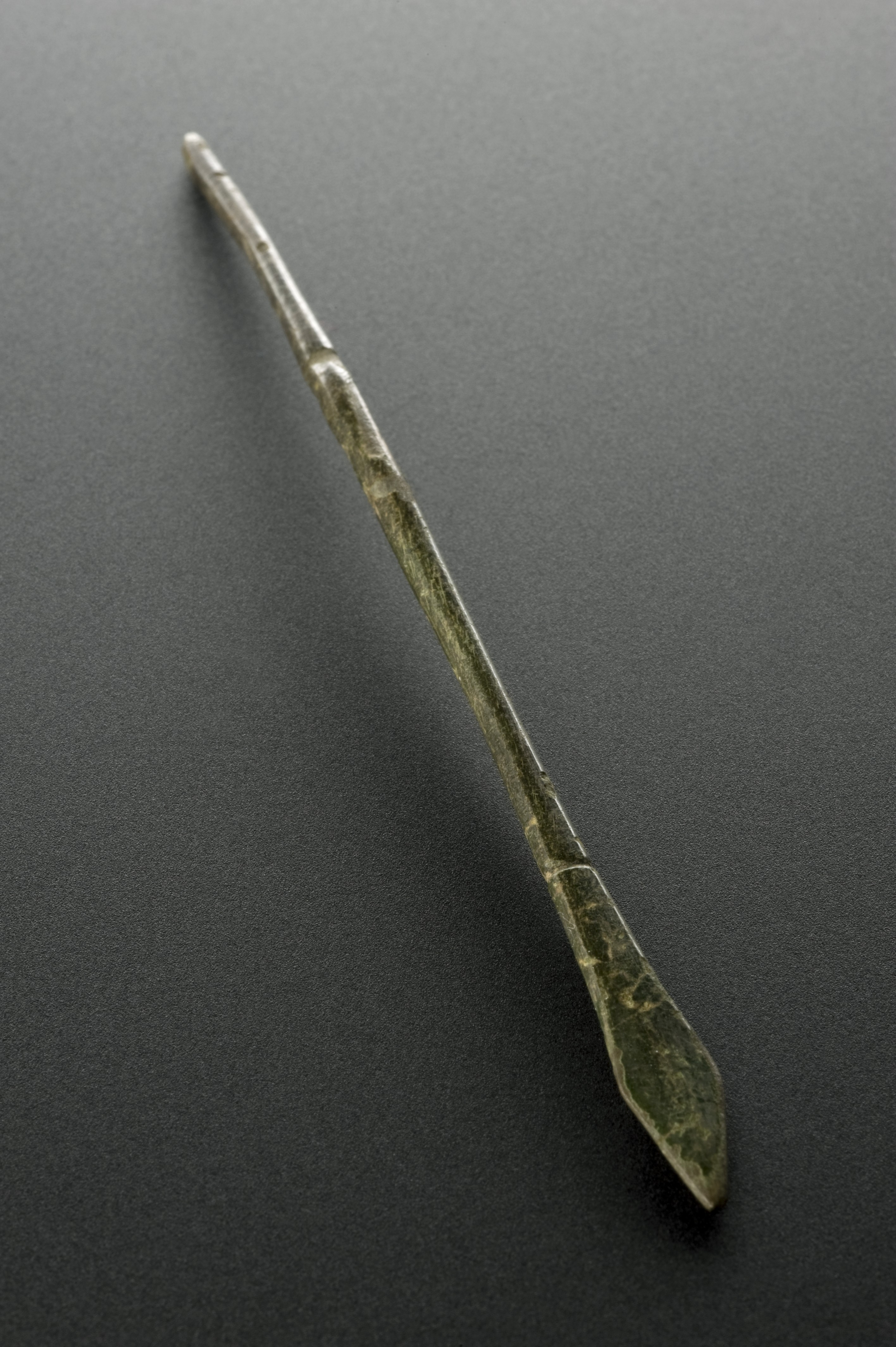
A lancet, a tool used in bloodletting

Amputations were used to treat gangrene. Ancient Roman surgeons utilized tools known as "blunt dissectors" to expose "vessels." Blunt dissectors were also involved in another procedure designed to treat headaches and ophthalmia. This operation began by shaving the patient's hair off. Then, a warm headband or fomentation was placed around their neck. Following this, ink was used to map the "vessels." The surgeon would then proceed to use their fingers to stretch the skin, and then an assistant would make an incision. To finish the procedure, hooks and dissectors were used to expose the "vessels." Blunt dissectors were usually leaf-shaped, and possibly with hexagonal handles. Another kind of dissector was curved dissectors. They were used to dissect lips that had been incised with a hook. One of these dissectors, which was stored in the National Archaeological Museum in France, was made of an ornamented handle with a small hook at one end. On the other was a leaf-shaped dissector.

=== Bloodletting ===
Bloodletting or a phlebotomy was a common practice in ancient Rome. It was common for surgeons to use a tool known as the phlebotome or the katias to make an incision into another point, which would cause the wound to bleed at another point. Another process involved putting a burning piece of cloth into the patient's mouth to draw out blood. Alternatively, leeches could be used. Ear scoops would be pressed on the proximal end of the vein. This would obstruct the blood flow, which would allow the phlebotome to be used to discharge blood.

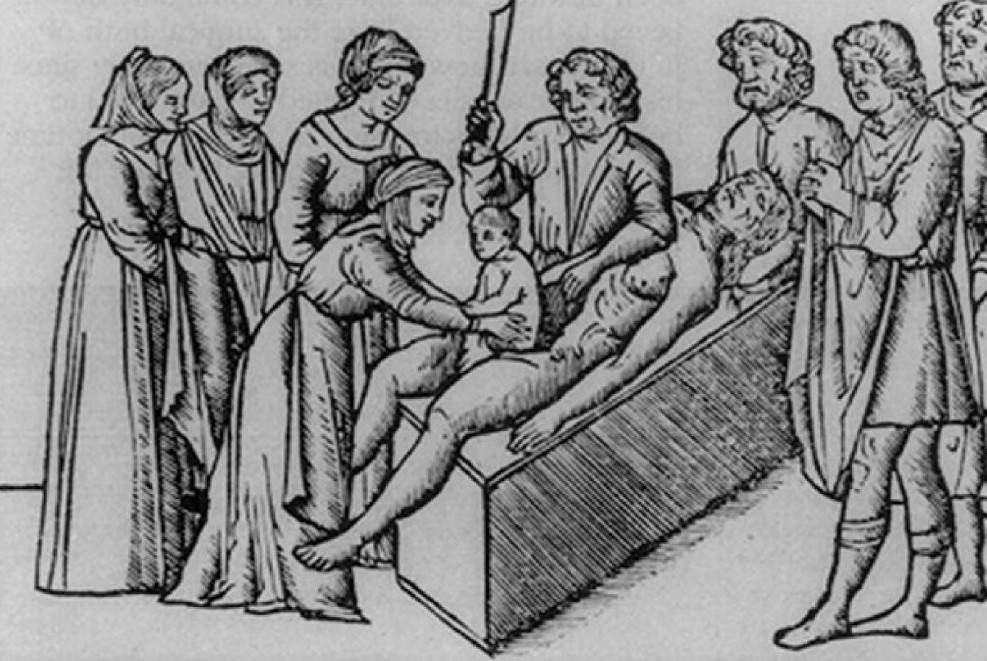
The birth of Julius Caesar, who Suetonius, a Roman historian says was born through a Caesarean section.

=== Caesarean section ===
During a Roman Caesarean section the doctors would make an incision into the abdomen and uterus of the mother. Following this, the baby was removed. This practice could also be conducted on dead mothers to remove the babies from their corpses. It was rare for doctors to perform this operation, as it bore a high mortality rate. According to Roman religion the god Asclepius was born by a Caesarian section. Roman historians Suetonius and Pliny the Elder also record Julius Caesar as being born through a Caesarian section. The veracity of these claims is debated.

=== Cataract surgery ===
Cataract surgery is a surgery in which cataracts are removed. This kind of surgery has been practiced since 29 CE in Ancient Rome. According to Celsus' description of cataract surgery, surgeons would use their right hand to perform on the left eye, and vice versa. During the procedure a needle was inserted between the pupil and the temple until it "meets resistance." Then, the surgeon would rotate the needle until the cataract had been pushed beneath the pupil. Following the cataract surgery, the patient would be treated with "soothing Medicants" and wool soaked in the white of the egg. The patient would also exclusively drink water and abstain from solid food until they no longer had an inflammation, which was a side effect of the surgery.

=== Cosmetic surgery ===
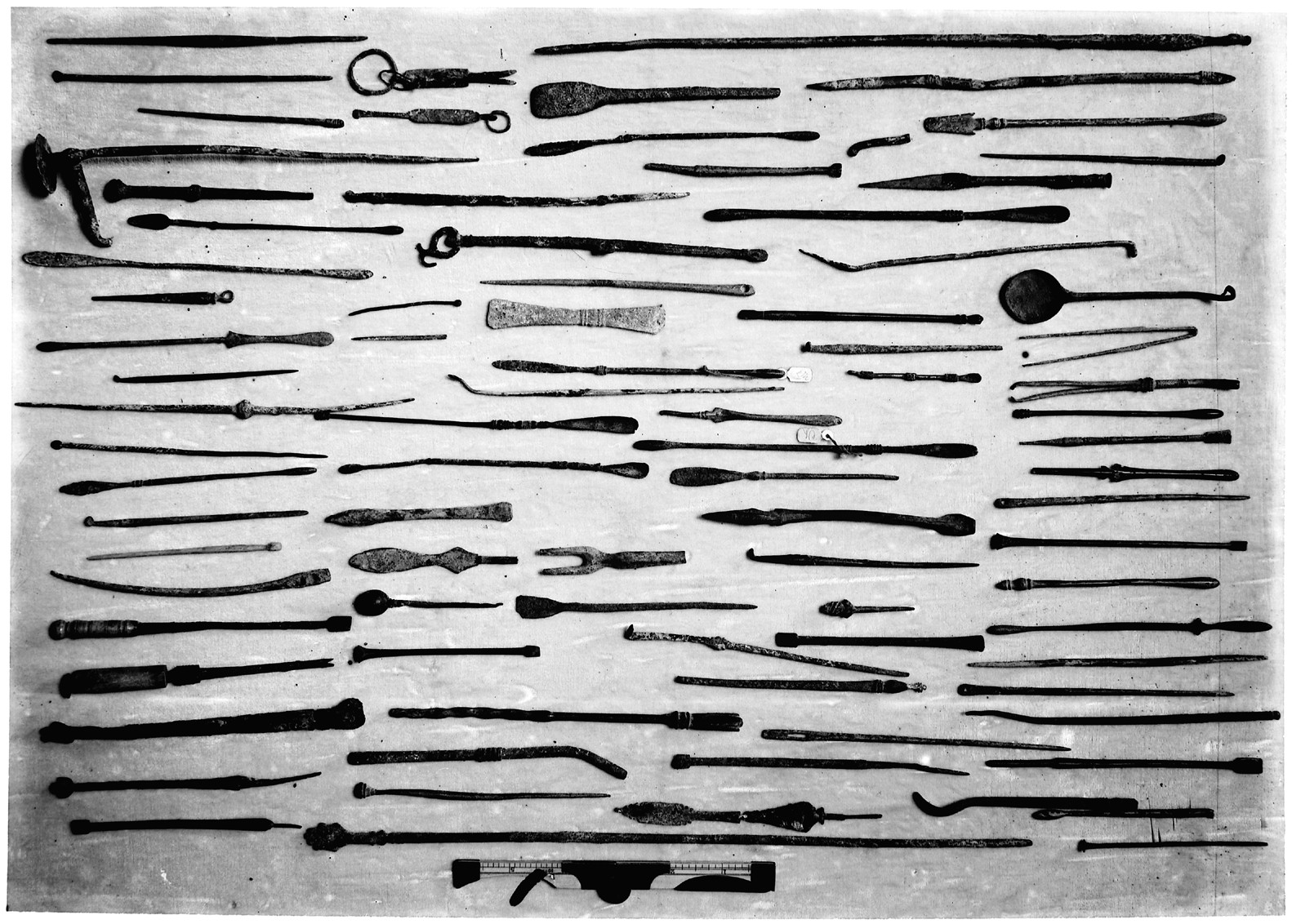
Ancient Roman needles. Needles such as these would have been used to treat Umbilical hernia.

Modern cosmetic surgery has origins in the ancient Greco-Roman world. Roman surgeons were capable of repairing damaged ears, noses, and lips. Celsus discussed rhinoplasty techniques in his De Medicina. Ancient rhinoplasty involved the grafting of a new nose onto the old one. Burns were treated using vinegar, ashes, cork, bran, or honey. To treat both, skin grafting was used. Galen, alongside Celsus, described the use of cheek reconstruction to heal facial injuries.

=== Hernia treatment ===
Hernia repair was done using trusses and bandages. Roman surgeons would conduct an operation designed to treat hernia. Usually, it was only used to treat small hernias belonging to young patients. It consisted of an incision into the scrotum. A tool known as the crow bill or the corvus was used to open the scrotum and cure the hernia. Another process involved using two blocks of wood to clamp the hemiscrotum, causing the sac to be inflamed, thus reducing its size. It also could be treated by removing the testicles and ligating the scrotum. Ligatures could also be used during these operations to avoid bleeding. The ancient Romans had treatments for umbilical hernia, a medical condition in which the abdominal wall behind the navel is damaged. Before this procedure, the patient was laid on their back to cause the hernia to fall back into the abdomen. Afterwards the navel was placed between two rods with their ends tied together, then a needle was placed inside of the protrusion.

=== Lithotomy ===
The ancient Romans practiced lithotomy, a surgical procedure to remove calculi. Usually, they were only conducted on individuals younger than 14. This was because the more developed prostate of older people enhanced the difficulty of the operation. One way this procedure could be practiced is by cutting through the bladder until the surgeon reached the perineum. An assistant held the patient in a lithotomy position, exposing their perineum. Two fingers were placed into the patient's rectum and against the perineum. Another procedure involved the usage of a scoop at the end of a probe to remove objects such as stones or beans and kidney stones.

=== Neurosurgery ===
Ancient Roman doctors were capable of performing neurosurgery on depressed skull fractures. Celsus believed that this surgery should be conducted with as little bone removed as possible. Galen disagreed, he wrote that doctors should elevate the bones and the bone fragments using forceps. During this operation a hole was drilled into the skull. Roman doctors believed this would cure headaches and relieve pressure. Flat chisels were used to cut away at overlying edges, and trepans were used to carve holes into interlocking bones.

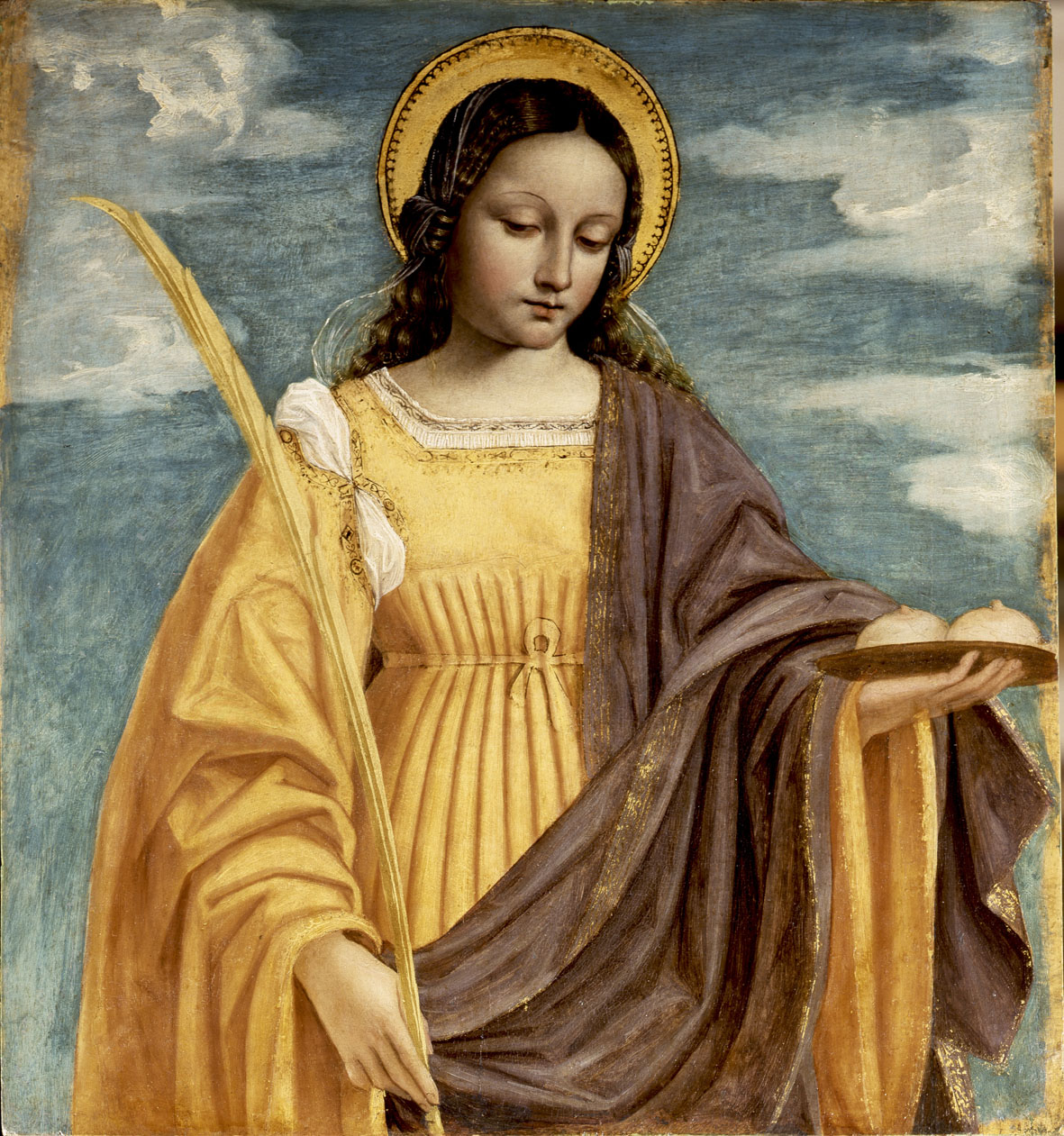
Painting of Saint Agatha holding her severed breasts

=== Sutures, ligatures, and contractions ===
Celsus describes the ligature technique for treating hemorrhoids. He also mentions that after the surgery patients suffered from urinary retention, which is the inability to fully empty the bladder. Galen believed that surgeons should choose to amputate, instead of sawing into healthy bones. He also wrote that to stop bleeding, pressure should be used instead of ligatures. Surgical techniques like tracheal intubation and tracheotomy date back to Ancient Rome. The ancient Roman writer Aulus Gellius described a technique that functioned similarly to bariatric surgery. Which is conducted to reduce the weight of obese individuals. In this technique the surgeon would forcefully contract the stomach, thus limiting the passage of food. Catgut sutures were used by the ancient Romans as early as the 2nd century CE. They also used sutures with metallic hooks. Celsus discusses other kinds of suturing techniques in his medical literature. He wrote that the wounds were to be stitched up. Roman doctors used linen, wool, silk, hair, and clips to seal wounds.

=== Tonsillectomies and mastectomies ===
The ancient Romans practiced tonsillectomies. Roman surgeons would use their fingers or a blunt hook to separate the tissue by the tonsils. Vinger mouthwash was used to induce hematopoiesis, or the stable production of blood cells. Following the surgery, the tonsils were cut out. It was common for patients to profusely bleed following the procedure. Roman surgeons usually would also remove the vulva. To treat breast cancer, the Romans had an operation similar to a mastectomy. It would remove the pectoral muscles of the sufferer. Galen wrote that doctors should cut through healthy tissue around the infected tissue, ensuring that all cancerous material was removed. This operation could also be used as a punishment. For example, Agatha of Sicily was a Christian saint who had her breasts cut off.

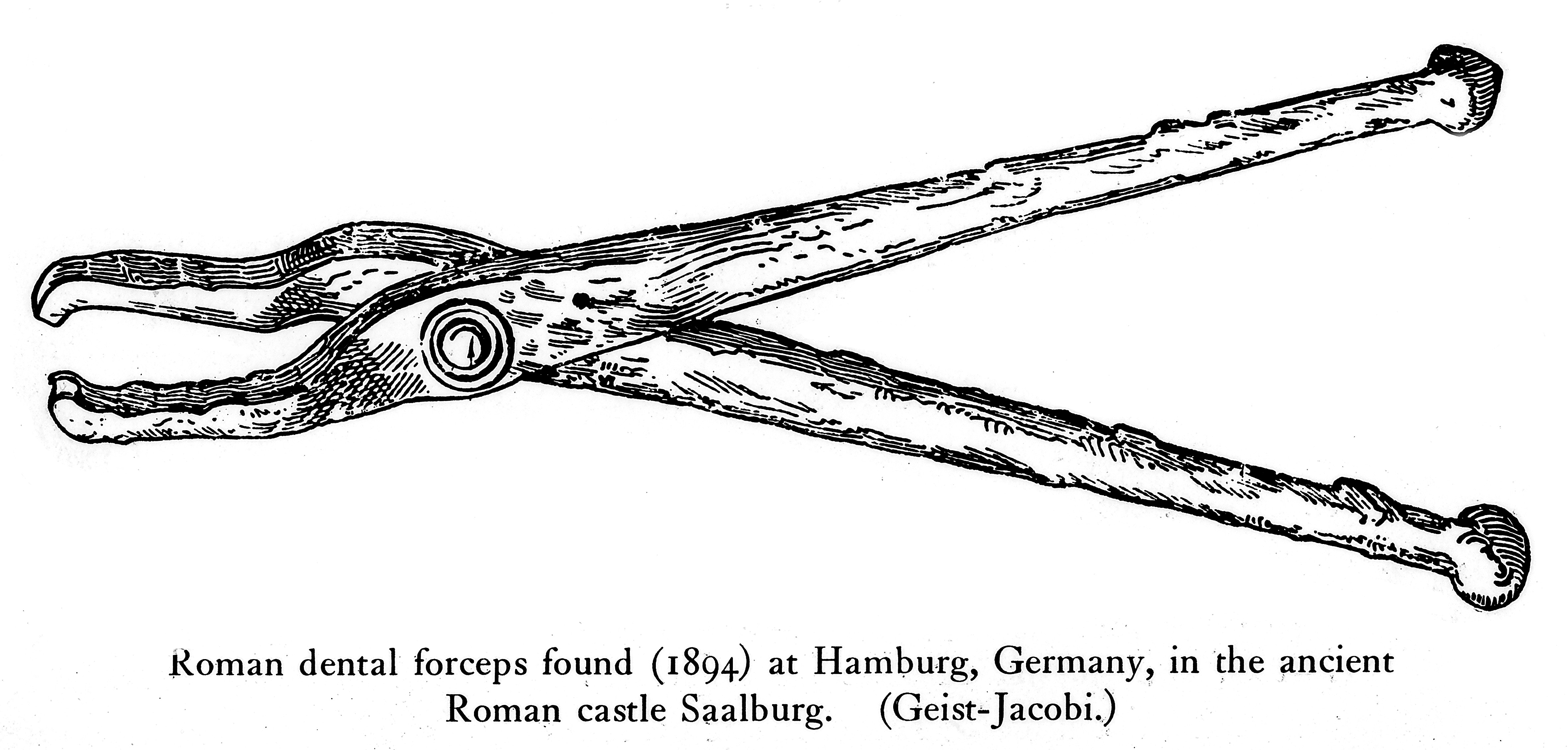
These ancient Roman dental forceps would have been used during tooth extractions.

=== Tooth extraction ===
It is unclear which Roman profession or professions would have performed dentistry. There may have been medical specialists trained to perform dental procedures, it is also possible that dentistry was practiced as a subset of other professions, such as barbery. Tooth extraction is an oral surgical procedure conducted to remove teeth. In ancient Rome, it may have been practiced by specialists who were not associated with any other medical professionals in ancient Rome. This practice required teeth to be extracted softly to avert the danger involved. This danger also resulted in the practice becoming rare. Ancient literature describes another process dedicated to extracting teeth. In this process, the tooth would be grabbed and rocked until it could be removed with hands. Another practice involved cutting the gum and bone surrounding a tooth and then extracting it. Celsus recommended that physicians should also extract the bone near the teeth and that they should refuse to extract children's teeth unless they were preventing adult teeth from growing.

=== Other techniques ===
The ancient surgeon Dioscorides used Mandragora offcinarum as a painkiller during surgery. Other substances were used, such as opium, henbane, wine, belladonna, and alcohol. Anal fistula were treated by passing probes through the anus, then once it was drawn out, a linen thread was placed into it. Following this the ends of the linen were tied to grip the skin by the fistula. To treat stab wounds in which the intestines fell out of the body, the surgeon would first examine the injuries to the intestines and their color. The large intestine was sutured, and if either intestine was pallid, black, or livid the patient was laid on their back with their hips raised. If the wound was too narrow to allow for an easy replacement of the intestines, the surgeon would cut it until it was "sufficiently wide." If the intestines were too dry, they were coated in water. Following this, an assistant would use their hands or hooks to separate the margins of the wound. Then the skin would be stitched with two rows of stitches. Projectiles were removed by enlarging the wound area with a scalpel, then using a forceps to drag the projectile out. To treat abscesses a scalpel or a spathion was used to make linear incisions. Afterwards, all the skin covering the pus was cut off. Following the surgery, the area was disinfected with honey. Another procedure involved using tongue depressors or spathomeles to depress the tongues of adult patients. Following this, the abscess was opened with a probe or a needle knife.
