= Spoon of Diocles =

Roman surgical instrument

The spoon of Diocles (Greek: κυαθίσκος τοῦ Διοκλέους) was a Roman surgical instrument described by Celsus. The instrument was designed by Diocles of Carystus to remove arrows from the human body. The instrument was used to remove the injured eye of Philip II without disfiguring him.

No genuine examples of the Spoon of Diocles are known to have survived to the present day, although some collections have forgeries and/or misidentified items. Historians Brian Campbell and Lawrence A. Tritle have expressed skepticism about the Spoon's authenticity, emphasizing that all information about the Spoon is based solely on writings by Celsus, with no mentions in works by others; they also feel that "it sounds impractical."
