= Substance abuse in ancient Rome =

Pre-modern drug and alcohol abuse

Drugs in ancient Rome were used for a variety of purposes. Cannabis and opium were used as medication to treat conditions such as insomnia or earaches. Roman doctors noticed the addictiveness of these drugs. They wrote that cannabis induced "a warm feeling" and opium was dangerous when diluted. Alcohol was believed to be beneficial when consumed in moderate amounts, yet harmful when consumed in excess. Ancient Roman authors and philosophers, such as Pliny and Seneca, believed that alcohol could cause problems such as frenzy, criminality, tiredness, hypersexuality, decreased sexual potency, and death, and that it would damage the social order.

== Alcoholism ==
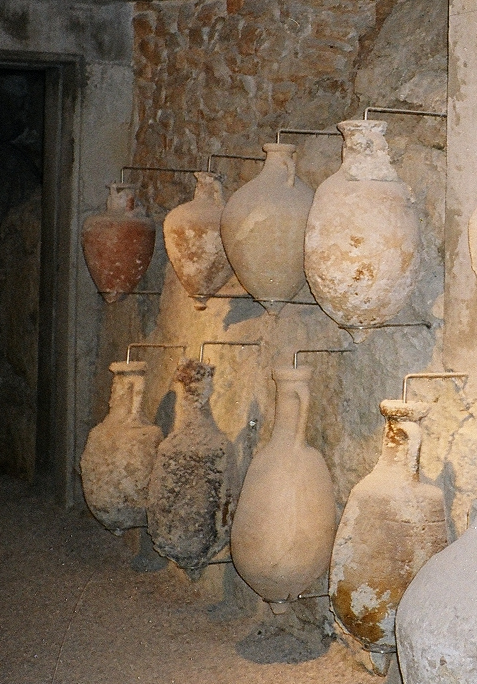
Amphorae used to store Roman wine.

Alcoholism may have been widespread in Rome from 600 BCE to 100 CE. Alcohol was common amongst both the upper and lower classes of Roman society. It was believed that moderate drinking would result in increased activity and greater sexual potency. However, alcoholism or excessive drinking would result in the opposite. Many ancient authors condemned drinking, believing it to be detrimental to the social order. The Romans also believed that consumption of alcohol by women would drive them to adultery and promiscuity.

Pliny the Elder, in his book Natural History, describes cases of alcoholism. He states that "a great part of mankind are of the opinion that there is nothing else in life worth living for". He also describes people being "driven to frenzy" and a "thousand crimes". Pliny also wrote that whilst drunk, people have a "pallid hue", "drooping eyelids", "tremulous hands", "inebriety", "dreams of monstrous lustfulness and forbidden delights", disturbed sleep, and hangovers. He states that many Romans were driven to their deaths by alcohol.

Seneca, a Roman philosopher, wrote that alcohol, when consumed in excess, would cause long-lasting damage that was felt even after the initial effects of the drink had worn off. He believed that drunkenness revealed and amplified personality defects. Seneca described alcoholics who appeared sober whilst having consumed large quantities of alcohol.

Ancient literature provides a few examples of alcoholism. Mark Antony was said to be a heavy drinker. Asclepiades of Ephesus was an ancient Roman man who possibly died of a digestive hemorrhage due to high amounts of alcohol intake, possibly because a doctor prescribed alcohol as medication. Alternatively, binge-drinking may have induced Mallory-Weiss Syndrome, which is bleeding from the mucosa in the stomach and esophagus. Galen describes a Roman teacher's young slave consuming copious amounts of alcohol, resulting in fever, remaining wide-awake, and delirium, which eventually resulted in the slave's death. Galen believed that children should be kept away from alcohol, as not doing so would only incite them to drink further.

== Cannabis ==
Cannabis sativa, also known to the Romans as Cannabion, asterion, and Schoinostrophon, was mentioned numerous times in Roman medical literature. Roman doctors such as Dioscorides and Galen wrote that cannabis could be used to create strong ropes, repel mosquitos, and that it would decrease sexual activity, cause impotence, and cause nausea. When consumed in great quantities cannabis was said to produce a "drying effect". This effect was described as inducing a "warm" feeling in the user. According to Galen, cannabis was served in small cakes for dessert.

Aetius, a Greco-Roman philosopher, described cannabis as "bad tasting" and "headache inducing." It was believed that cannabis could treat gonorrhea. Oribasius, the physician of Emperor Julian, believed that cannabis "harms the head" and that it "creates a warm feeling." Marcellus Empiricus wrote that cannabis, when wrapped around the arm and suspended from the neck with a loom weight and a thread, could stop blood flow. Pliny writes that a decoction of cannabis could be used to treat diarrhea in farm animals, gout, arthritis, and earaches. Pliny may have confused multiple different purposes of or kinds of cannabis.

== Opium ==
The usage of opium to treat illnesses such as insomnia, pain, coughs, hysteria, and conditions involving the digestive system was popularized by Galen. Ancient doctors were aware of the addictiveness of opium, and how dangerous an overdose was. Greek physicians believed that opium could cause blindness and death. Roman doctors such as Dioscorides believed that Greek doctors were excessively paranoid about opium's risks.

Dioscorides wrote that altering the opium would result in different outcomes. If cut with glaucium, which is a genus of flowers, it would result in saffron opium. If cut with grease, set on fire, and put in a jar, it would result in soft and yellowish-red opium. Adding resin would result in transparent and weaker opium. Both Greek and Roman doctors believed that opium could be used to induce sleep. Dioscorides wrote that to be used as morphine, the leaves and the pods should be boiled, or the sap could be poured on the head. After the fall of Western Rome, opium mostly disappeared from the western world.
