= Medicine in ancient Rome =

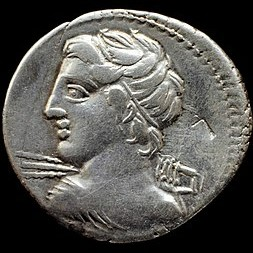
Ancient Roman coin depicting Vejovis, the Roman god of medicine throwing a thunderbolt

Medicine in ancient Rome was highly influenced by ancient Greek medicine, but also developed new practices through knowledge of the Hippocratic Corpus combined with use of the treatment of diet, regimen, along with surgical procedures. This was most notably seen through the works of two of the prominent Greek physicians, Dioscorides and Galen, who practiced medicine and recorded their discoveries. This is contrary to two other physicians like Soranus of Ephesus and Asclepiades of Bithynia, who practiced medicine both in outside territories and in ancient Roman territory, subsequently. Dioscorides was a Roman army physician, Soranus was a representative for the Methodic school of medicine, Galen performed public demonstrations, and Asclepiades was a leading Roman physician. These four physicians all had knowledge of medicine, ailments, and treatments that were healing, long lasting and influential to human history. Medicine in Ancient Rome was one of the most important influences to the modern medicine we have now.

Ancient Roman medicine was divided into specializations such as ophthalmology and urology. To increase their knowledge of the human body, physicians used a variety of surgical procedures for dissection that were carried out using many different instruments including forceps, scalpels and catheters.

== Introduction ==
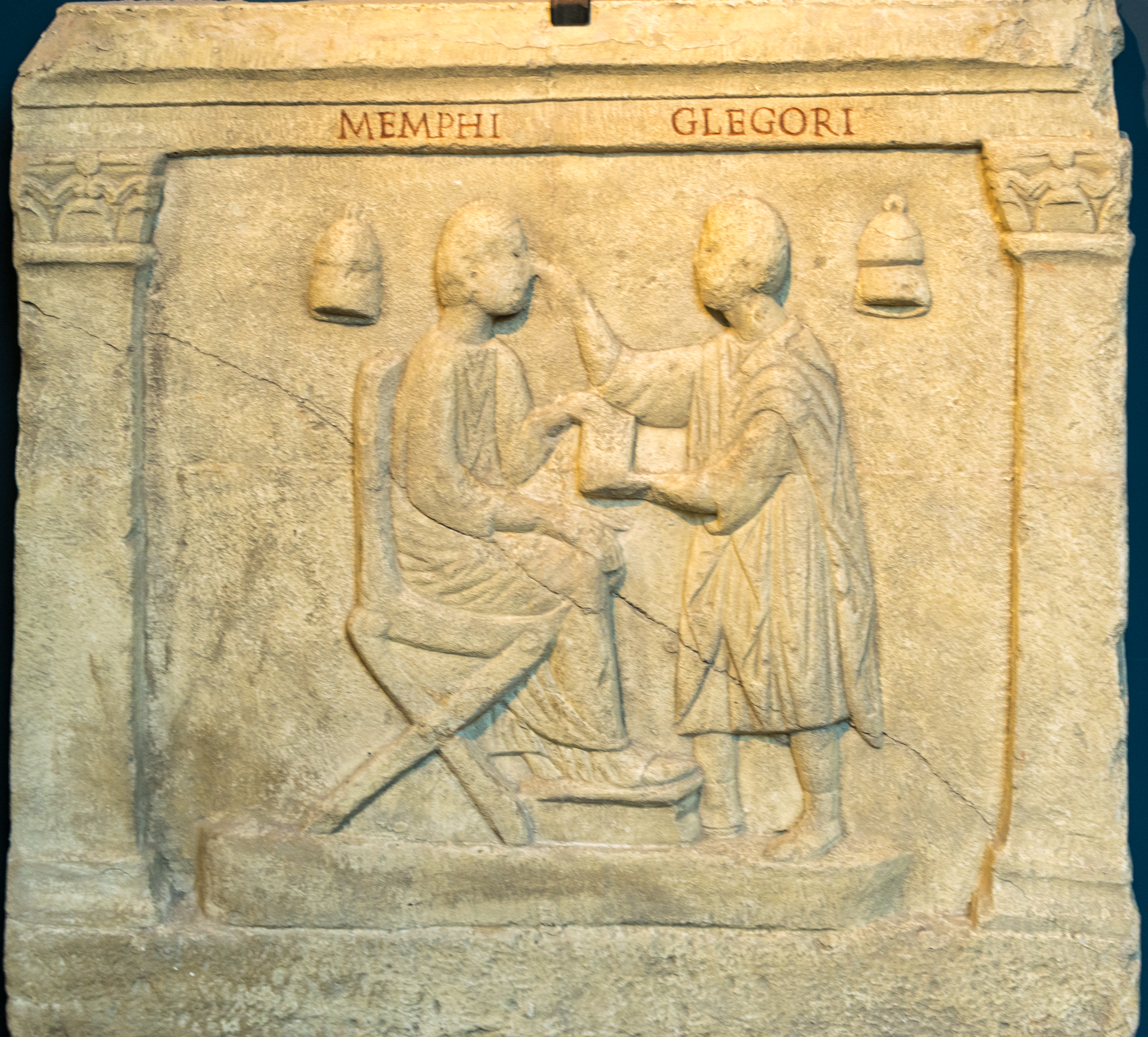
Relief from a sarcophagus depicting an oculist examining a patient (latter 3rd century AD)

The Roman Empire was a complex and vigorous combination of Greek and Roman cultural elements forged through centuries of contact. Later Latin authors, notably Cato and Pliny, believed in a specific traditional Roman type of healing based on herbs, chants, prayers and charms easily available to and by the head of household.

Greek medicine was introduced into Italy with the establishment and development of military and political contacts between the two regions. It was not until the introduction of the healing god Asclepius in 291 BC and the arrival of the Greek doctor Archagathus in 219 BC that foreign medicine was publicly accepted in Rome, mainly due to future overall adaptation to the Roman practices.

Setting aside some of the broader implications of the Greek influence on Roman society, the effect of ancient Greek medicine, ethnography, and meteorology was particularly pertinent to two fields: architecture and health care. This was particularly important from the perspective of the Roman army, in which there were many medical advances. A medical corpus was established, permanent physicians were appointed, the valetudinaria (military hospitals) were established, and in Caesar's time, the first traces of systematic care for the wounded appeared. The variety and nature of the surgical instruments discovered in Roman remains indicate a good knowledge of surgery.

== Roman medicine ==
Roman medicine was highly influenced by the Greek medical tradition. Prior to the introduction of Greek medicine Roman medicine was a combination of religion and magic. The first Roman physicians were religious figures with no medical training or the head of the family. The first professional physicians were Greek physicians. Asclepiades of Bithynia arrived in 124 BC. He was a popular physician known for his kindness to his patients often prescribing wine, rest and a swinging couch. The incorporation of Greek medicine into Roman society allowed Rome to transform into a monumental city by 100 BC. Like Greek physicians, Roman physicians relied on naturalistic observations rather than on spiritual rituals; but that does not imply an absence of spiritual belief. Tragic famines and plagues were often attributed to divine punishment; and appeasement of the gods through rituals was believed to alleviate such events. Miasma was perceived to be the root cause of many diseases, whether caused by famine, wars, or plague. The concept of contagion was formulated, resulting in practices of quarantine and improved sanitation. The Romans established systems of public hygiene indicating there was an understanding that this was of importance to public health. This can be seen in their practices of burying the dead outside the city walls, their large supplies of water available through aqueducts, public bathing areas and public sewage systems. They also began draining swamps in close proximity to cities.

One of the first prominent doctors in Rome was Galen. He became an expert on the human anatomy by dissecting animals, including monkeys, in Greece. Due to his prominence and expertise in ancient Rome, Galen became Emperor Marcus Aurelius' personal physician.

In 46 BC, Julius Caesar granted Roman citizenship to physicians when the Roman army had a need for trained surgeons. The Romans conquered the city of Alexandria in 30 BC, which was an important center for learning; its Great Library held countless volumes of ancient Greek medical information. The Romans adopted many of the practices and procedures they found in the Great Library. In 10 AD Augustus gave tax immunity to physicians practicing in Rome, as well as excluding them from public duties. These incentives caused uneducated and unqualified physicians to flood to Rome, causing tax exemption to only be offered to a select number of public physicians per region.

== Opposition to Greek medicine in Rome / Pre-Physicians ==
Cato the Elder despised every aspect of Greek society the Romans decided to mimic including sculptures, literature and medicine. He regarded the welcome given in Rome to Greek medicine and physicians as a major threat. In Rome, before there were doctors, the pater familias (head of the family) was responsible for treating the sick. Cato the Elder himself examined those who lived near him, often prescribing cabbage as a treatment for many ailments ranging from constipation to deafness. He would issue precise instructions on how to prepare the cabbage for patients with specific ailments. He also used cabbage in liquid form. For example, a mixture of cabbage, water, and wine would be embedded in a deaf man's ear to allow his hearing to be restored. Cato would treat fractured or broken appendages with two ends of a cut reed that were bandaged around the injury.

== Contributors ==
Many Greek doctors came to Rome. Many of them strongly believed in achieving the right balance of the four humors and restoring the natural heat of patients. Around 200 BC many wealthy families in Rome had personal Greek physicians. By around 50 BC, it was more common than not to have a Greek physician. Physicians were also more inclined to study anthropology, biology and physiology because of the great impact that philosophy had on them. The popular belief was that philosophy created interest in medicine as opposed to medicine creating an interest in philosophy.

=== Dioscorides ===
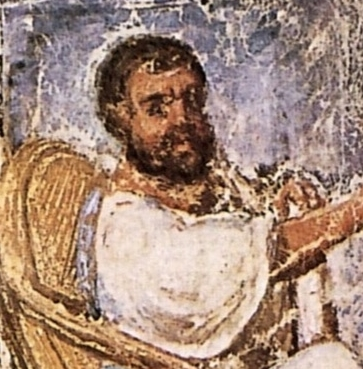
Illustration of Dioscorides

Pedanius Dioscorides (c. 40–90 AD), was a Greek botanist, pharmacologist and physician who practiced in Rome during the reign of Nero. Dioscorides studied botany and pharmacology in Tarsus. He became a well-known army surgeon. While traveling with the army, Dioscorides was able to experiment with the medical properties of many plants. Compared to his predecessors, his work was considered the largest and most thorough in regards to naming and writing about medicines, many of Dioscorides predecessors work was lost. Dioscorides wrote a 5-volume encyclopedia, De materia medica, which listed over 600 herbal cures, forming an influential and long-lasting pharmacopoeia. De materia medica was used extensively by doctors for the following 1500 years. Within his five books, Dioscorides mentions approximately 1,000 simple drugs. Also contained in his books, Dioscorides refers to opium and mandragora as a sleeping potion that can be used as a natural surgical anesthetic.

=== Galen ===
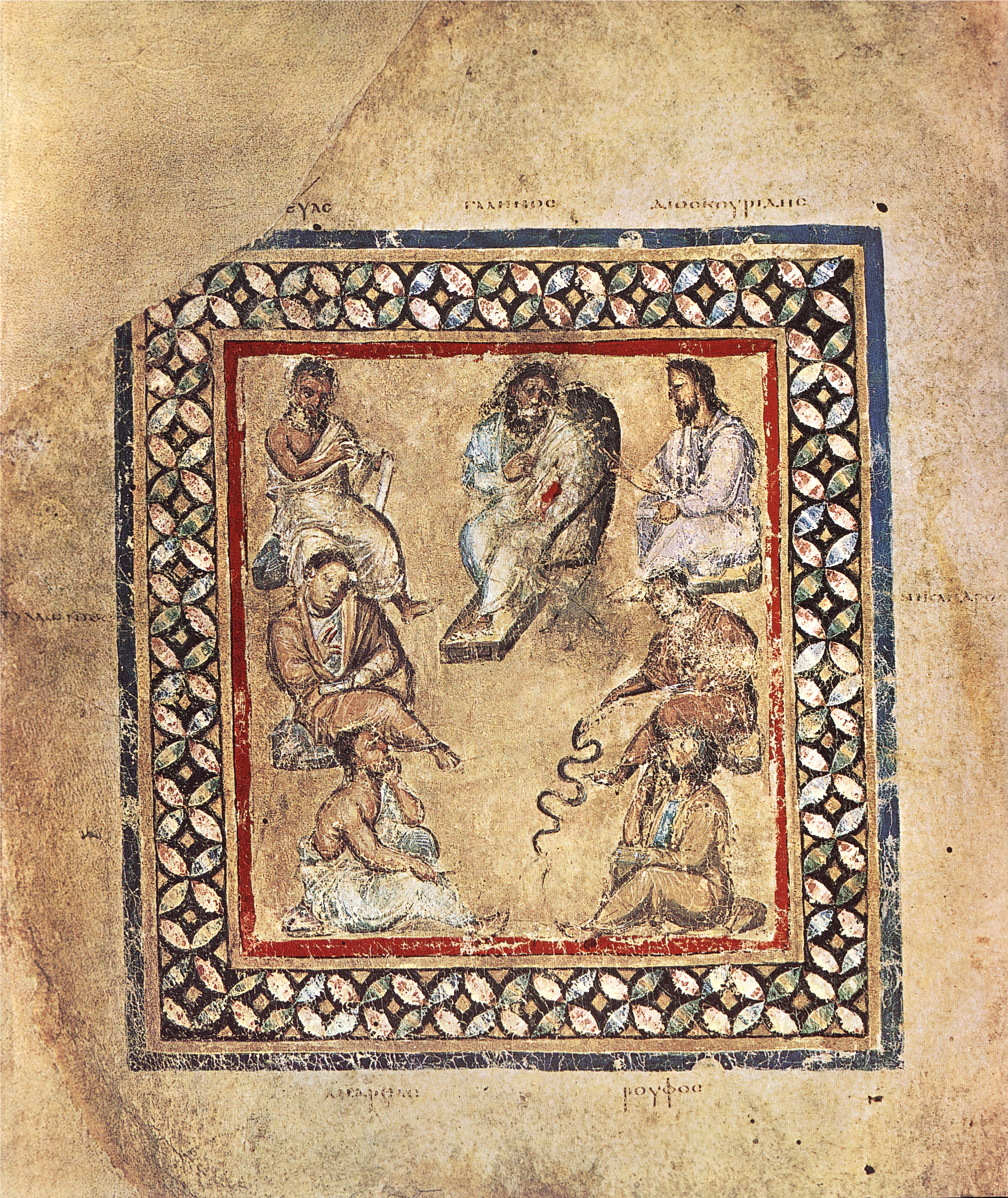
A group of physicians in an image from the Vienna Dioscurides; Galen is depicted top center.

Galen of Pergamon (129 – c. AD 216) was a prominent Greek physician, whose theories dominated Western medical science for well over a millennium. By the age of 20, he had served for four years in the local temple as a therapeutes ("attendant" or "associate") of Asclepius. Although Galen studied the human body, dissection of human corpses was against Roman law, so instead he used pigs, apes, sheep, goats, and other animals. Through studying animal dissections, Galen applied his animal anatomy findings and developed a theory of human anatomy.

Galen moved to Rome in 162. There he lectured, wrote extensively, and performed public demonstrations of his anatomical knowledge. He soon gained a reputation as an experienced physician, attracting to his practice a large number of patients. Among them was the consul Flavius Boethius, who introduced him to the imperial court, where he became a physician to Emperor Marcus Aurelius. Despite being a member of the court, Galen reputedly shunned Latin, preferring to speak and write in his native Greek. He treated Roman emperors Lucius Verus, Commodus, and Septimius Severus. In 166, Galen returned to Pergamon, but went back to Rome for good in 169.

Galen followed Hippocrates' theory of the four humours, believing that one's health depended on the balance between the four main fluids of the body (blood, yellow bile, black bile, and phlegm). Food was believed to be the initial object that allowed the stabilization of these humours. By contrast, drugs, venesection, cautery and surgery were drastic and were to be used only when diet and regimen could no longer help. The survival and amendment of Hippocratic medicine is attributed to Galen, who coupled the four qualities of cold, heat, dry, and wet with the four main fluids of the body, would remain in health care for another millennia or so.

Galen wrote a short essay called "The Best Doctor Is Also A Philosopher", where he writes that a physician needs to be knowledgeable about not just the physical, but additionally logical and ethical philosophy. He writes that a physician "must be skilled at reasoning about the problems presented to him, must understand the nature and function of the body within the physician world, and must practice temperance and despise all money". The ideal physician treats both the poor and elite fairly and is a student of all that affects health. Galen thought that eleven years of study was an adequate amount of time to make a competent physician. He references Hippocrates throughout his writings, saying that Hippocratic literature is the basis for physicians' conduct and treatments. The writings of Galen survived longer than the writings of any other medical researchers of antiquity. Galen also wrote an astrological doctrine, De diebus decretorus (Critical Days Book III), in which he describes the importance of astrology in prognosis and diagnosis. In On Semen, Galen discusses his views on embryology in distinction to the earlier views articulated by Aristotle.

=== Asclepiades ===
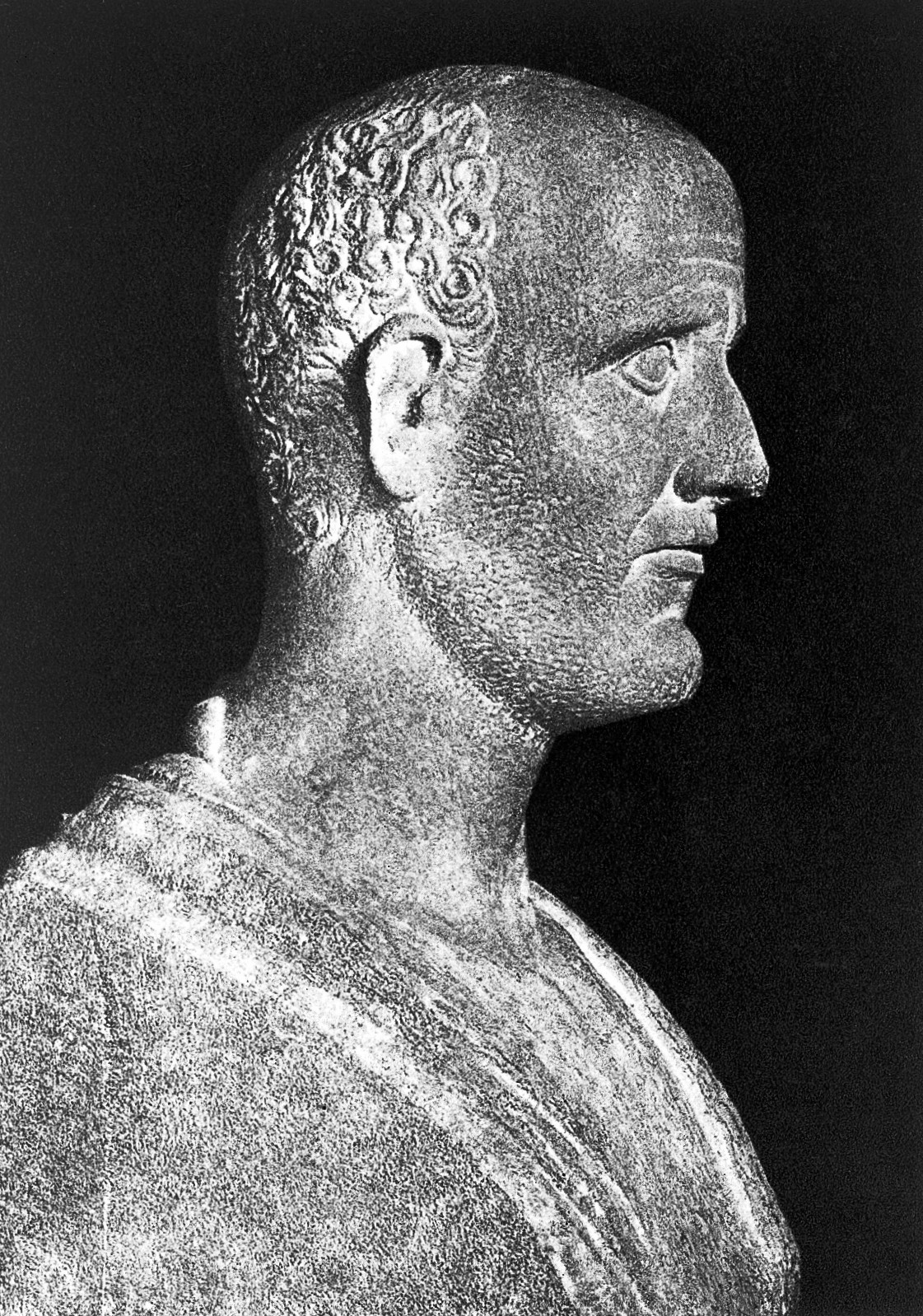
Bust of Asclepiades

Asclepiades studied to be a physician in Alexandria and practiced medicine in Asia Minor as well as Greece before he moved to Rome in the 1st century BC. His knowledge of medicine allowed him to flourish as a physician. Asclepiades was a leading physician in Rome and was a close friend of Cicero.

He developed his own version of the molecular structure of the human body. Asclepiades' atomic model contained multi-shaped atoms that passed through bodily pores. These atoms were either round, square, triangular. Asclepiades noted that as long as the atoms were flowing freely and continuously, then the health of the human was maintained. He believed that if the atoms were too large or the pores were too constricted, then illness would present in multiple symptoms such as fever, spasms, or in more severe cases paralysis.

Asclepiades strongly believed in hot and cold baths as a remedy for illness; his techniques purposely did not inflict severe pain upon the patient. Asclepiades used techniques with the intent to cause the least amount of discomfort while continuing to cure the patient. His other remedies included music therapy to induce sedation, and consuming wine to cure headache and a fever. Asclepiades is the first documented physician in Rome to use massage therapy.

=== Aulus Cornelius Celsus ===
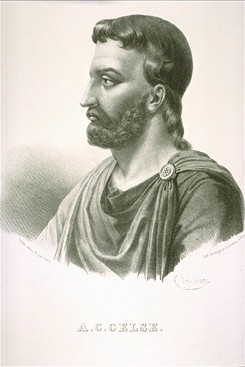
Lithograph of Aulus Cornelius Celsus

Celsus (25 BC–AD 50) was a Roman encyclopaedist who wrote a general encyclopaedia about many subjects. His exact place of birth as well as when he lived are unknown; however, it is known he lived during the reigns of Augustus and Tiberius. The only surviving work from his larger encyclopaedia is De Medicina. This work contains eight volumes, two of which are on surgery. De Medicina provides some of the best accounts of Roman medicine during his time. Its contents proved to be valuable even into the 15th century after Pope Nicolas V rediscovered it, becoming the first medical book to be published in 1478. It is still debated if he practiced medicine himself or just compiled the works of the time, much of it from Greek sources. This is important because at the time Greeks were looked down upon by the Romans and thus so was the work of doctors.

In his book he discussed the two different schools of thought at the time relating to medicine he calls "Empirics" and "Dogmatics". Empirics followed empirical observation while Dogmatics needed to understand the theory behind how a treatment works. Celsus is also credited with writing on four of the five characteristics of inflammation, redness (rubor), swelling (tumour), heat (calor), and pain (dolor). Galen would write about the fifth, loss of function (functio laesa).

=== Soranus ===
Soranus was a Greek physician born in Ephesus, who lived during the reigns of Trajan and Hadrian (98–138 AD). According to the Suda, he trained at the Alexandria School of Medicine and practiced in Rome. Soranus was a part of the Methodic school of Asclepiades, which fostered the ideals of the Hippocratic doctrine. He was the chief representative of the Methodic school of physicians. Soranus's most notable work was his book gynaecology, in which he discussed many topics that are considered modern ideas such as birth control, pregnancy, midwife's duties, and post-childbirth care. His treatise Gynaecology is extant (first published in 1838, later by V. Rose, in 1882, with a 6th-century Latin translation by Muscio, a physician of the same school). He accounts for the internal difficulties that could arise during labor from both the mother and the fetus. He also did work with fractures, surgery, and embryology.

== Hospitals ==
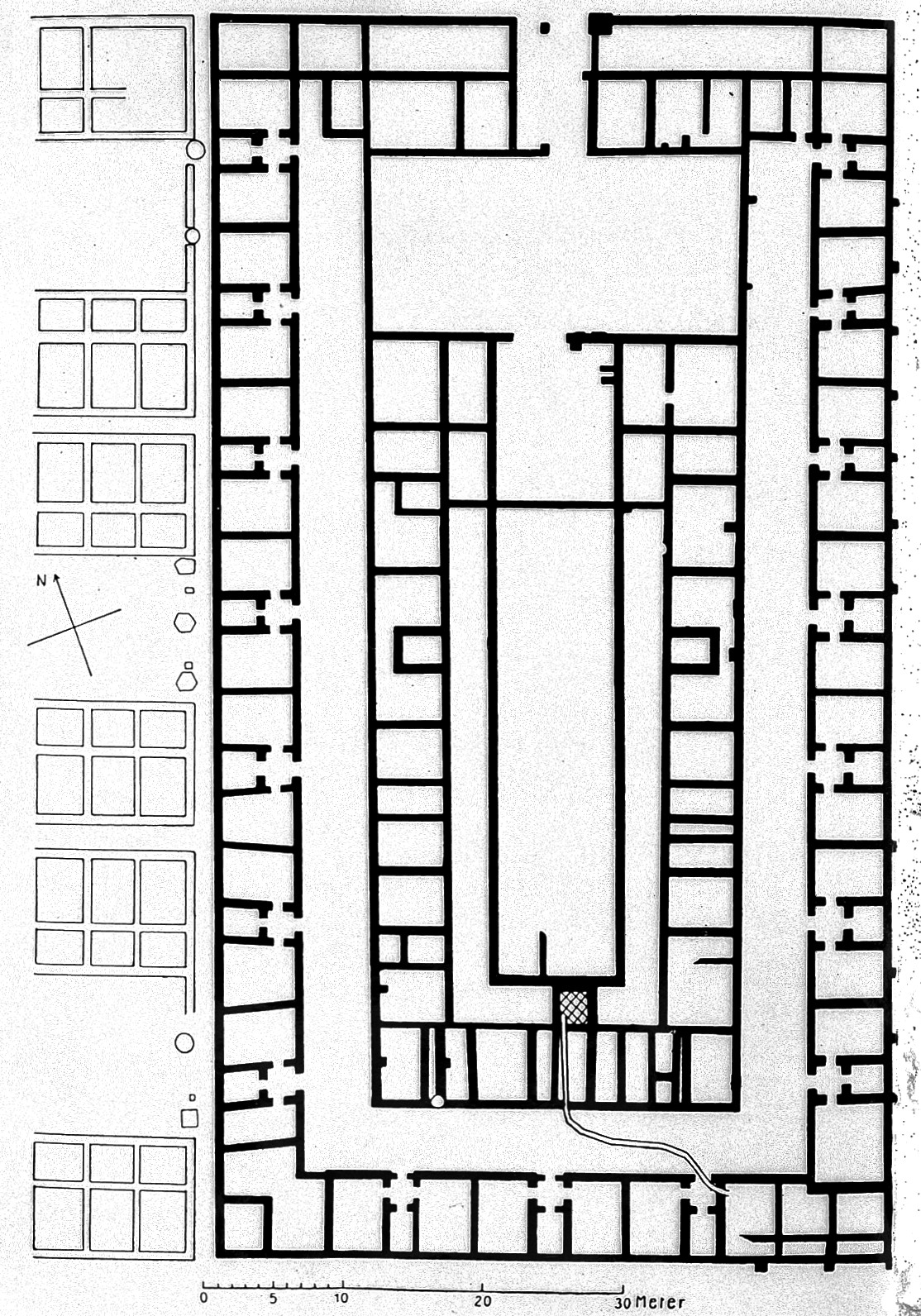
Plan of valetudinarium, near Düsseldorf, Germany. Late 1st century.

The Roman medical system saw the establishment of the first hospitals; these were reserved for slaves and soldiers. Physicians were assigned to follow armies or ships, tending to the injured. In Rome, death was caused by a combination of poor sanitation, famine, disease, epidemics, malnutrition, and warfare; this led to high Roman mortality rates. The development of health services was prolonged by the unsympathetic attitudes of the Romans towards the sick, superstition, and religious beliefs.

Ancient Roman hospitals were established by the 1st century BC as military hospitals known as valetudinaria. The valetudinaria began as a small cluster of tents and fortresses dedicated to wounded soldiers. The original hospitals were built along major roads, and soon became part of Roman fort architecture. They were usually placed near the outer wall in a quiet part of the fortification. The earliest known Roman hospitals of the Roman Empire were built in the 1st and 2nd centuries AD, in the reign of the emperor Trajan. The Roman military established these hospitals, as the army's expansion beyond the Italian Peninsula meant that the wounded could no longer be cared for in private homes. The temporary forts developed into permanent facilities over time. It is possible that some valteduinaria were established at earlier parts of history. They may also have been established by Julius Caesar. Other hospitals were possibly built during the reign of Augustus or Claudius.

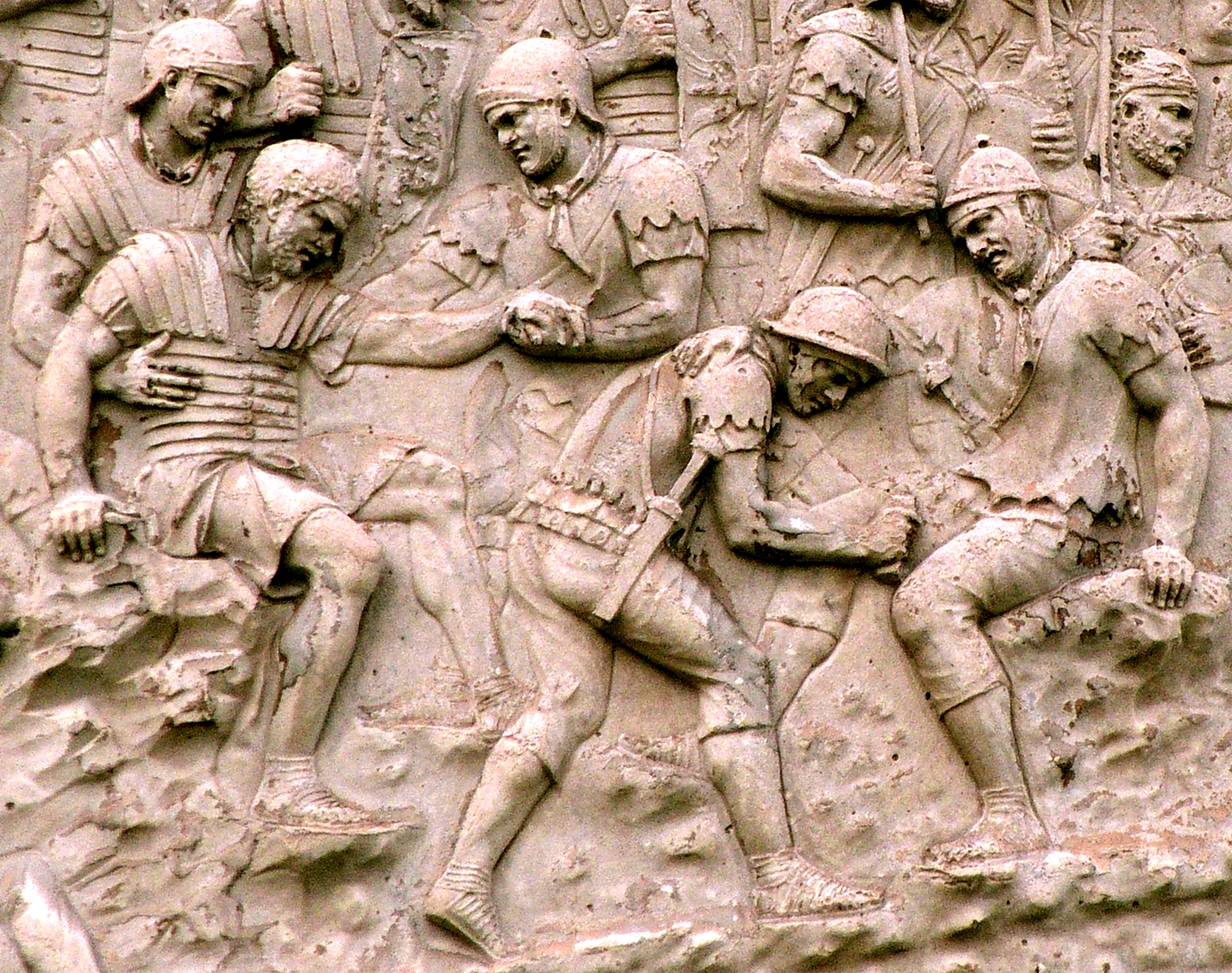
Capsarii tending to injured soldiers depicted on Trajan's Column

Valetudinaria were field hospitals or flying military camps primarily used to treat soldiers in the military. Access to these hospitals was likely an important perk of military service. The care these institutions provided was likely highly professional for the time, and they were capable of holding up to 200 patients. Celsus describes these hospitals as large and staffed by "over-worked doctors". These over-worked doctors were known as the medici. Alongside the medici, there was a group of veterinarians, administrators, and wound dressers, known as veteranarii, optio valetudinarii, and capsarii respectively. Other hospitals were designed to care for slaves. Slave valetudinaria were of lower quality then the military hospitals, with less equipment and poorer doctors. Roman writers compared these institutions to veterinary care, and equated the treatment these hospitals gave to barbarity.

A standard valetudinarium was a rectangular building consisting of four wings, connected by an entrance hall that could be used as a triage center. Each legion's hospital was constructed to accommodate 6–10% of the legion's 5,000 men. The building also included a large hall, reception ward, dispensary, kitchen, staff quarters, and washing and latrine facilities. All of these hospitals were the exact same shape and layout, and one was located in every castra.

Doctors could also set up public clinics in tabernae. Tabernae were another way of getting medical attention in ancient Rome. These facilities were very expensive, and there was no inpatient care. This method was rare; it was far more common for the physician to arrive at the patient's house. People who could not afford a doctor or go to a valetudinaria would pray at a temple of Asclepius, the Roman god of medicine, for healing.

== Surgery ==
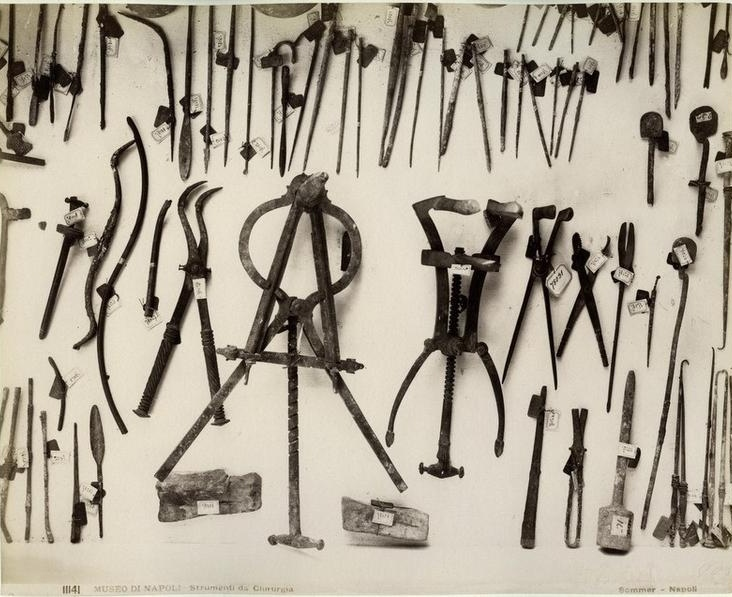
Roman surgical instruments found at Pompeii

Surgery was typically used as a last resort because of the risks involved. When surgery did happen though, it was usually limited to the surface of the body because doctors recognized that injuries regarding the body's most important physiological functions (brain, heart, spine, etc.) could not usually be treated. There were a variety of surgical tools in ancient Rome. For example, bone levers were tools used to remove diseased bone tissue from the skull and to remove foreign objects (such as a weapon) from a bone. The ancient Romans were capable of performing techniques like cataract surgery and caesarean sections. They also could perform more outdated procedures such as bloodletting. Ancient Roman surgery was developed in the 2nd century from Greek techniques by doctors such as Galen.

== Medicines ==
=== Diet ===
Correct diet was seen as essential to healthy living. Food was perceived to have a healing effect or a causative effect on disease, determined by its impact on the humors; as well as preventing disease. Some of these foods included rice, chickpeas, and olives, which were widely used by the Roman military. At an archaeological site, other plants were found that were used for medicinal purposes such as lentils, garden peas, and figs. A variety of meats were also discovered at the site which were believed to be used for sick individuals. Poultry, eggs, and oysters were used as a diet for those with health issues. Moderation of foods was key to healthy living and gave rise to healthy eating philosophies. When diet no longer promoted health, drugs, phlebotomy, cautery, or surgery were used. Patients having control of their lives, managing their own preventative medical diets, and the freedom to seek physicians, indicates that patient autonomy was valued.

=== Herbal and other medicines ===
Roman physicians used a wide range of herbal and other medicines. Their ancient names, often derived from Greek, do not necessarily correspond to individual modern species, even if these have the same names. Known medicines include:

Roman medicines, according to Dioscorides
| Probable substance | Latin/Greek name | Indication and Effects | Reference |
|---|---|---|---|
| Fennel | Ippomarathron | Cures painful urination; expels menstrual flow; stops bowel discharge; brings out breast milk; breaks kidney and urinary stones | |
| Rhubarb | Ra | For flatulence, convulsions, internal disorders (stomach, spleen, liver, kidneys, womb, peritoneum), sciatica, asthma, rickets, dysentery, etc. | |
| Gentian | Gentiane | Warming, astringent; for poisonous bites, liver disorders; induces abortion; treats deep ulcers, eye inflammation | |
| Birthwort | Aristolochia | Poisonous; assists in childbirth | |
| Liquorice | Glukoriza | Calms stomach; chest, liver, kidney and bladder disorders | |
| Aloe | Aloe | Heals wounds (applied dry); removes boils; purgative; treats alopecia | |

Statues and healing shrines were sites of prayer and sacrifice for both the poor and the elite, and were common throughout the Roman Empire. Reverence for shrines and statues reflected a search for healing, guidance, and alternatives to ineffectual human physicians and drugs.

In 2013, Italian scientists studied the content of a Roman shipping vessel, known as the Relitto del Pozzino, sank off the coast of Populonia, Tuscany around 120 BC, which was excavated during the 1980s and 90s. The vessel had a medicine chest with pyxides inside, which contained medicinal tablets or pills full of a number of zinc compounds, as well as iron oxide, starch, beeswax, pine resin and other plant-derived materials, all probably served as some sort of eye medicine or eyewash.

== Treatments ==
=== Healing sanctuaries ===
A physician's overall goal was to help those afflicted by disease or injury as best as they could; the physician's credibility rested on their successful cures. Of course they could not reliably cure ailments; sometimes the best they could hope for was that their treatments did not worsen their patients' problems. Many physicians were criticised by their peers for their inability to cure an apparently simple illness. Gaps in physician-provided care were filled with several types of supernatural healthcare; the Romans believed in the power of divine messages and healing. There have been descriptions of many gods from multiple religions that dealt with destruction or healing. For example, in 431 BC, in response to the plague running rampant all over the country of Italy, the temple of the Apollo Medicus was accredited with an influence of healing.

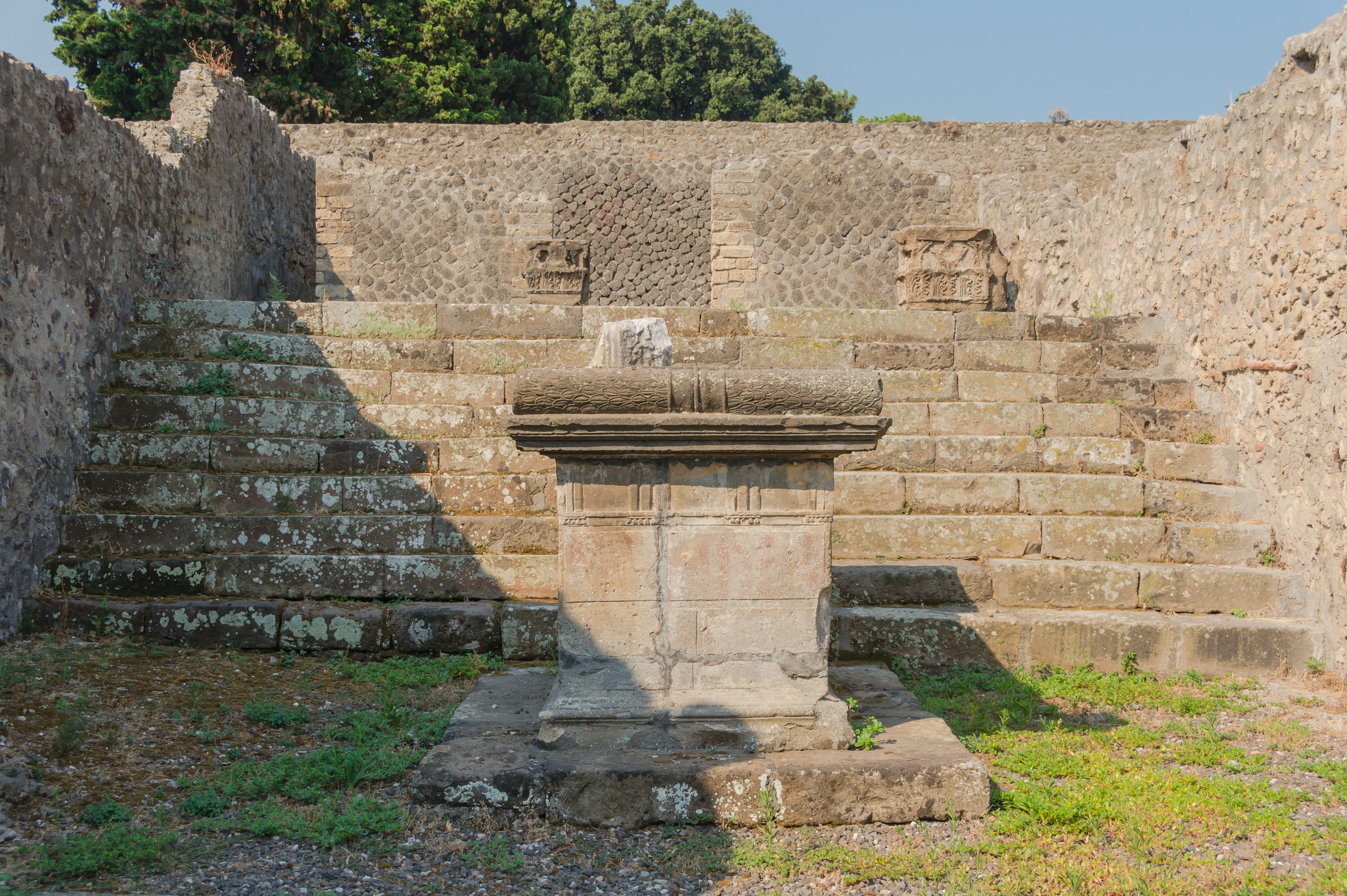
Altar in the temple of Aesculapius, Pompeii, Italy

Scattered across Greco-Roman and Egyptian history are descriptions of healing sanctuaries dedicated to the various healing gods. Sick or injured Romans would often flock to Asclepieia, temples dedicated to Asclepius, the god of healing, as it was believed that the god actually inhabited the sanctuary and would provide divine healing to supplicants. The process itself was simple: the sick person would give a specified donation to the temple, and then undergo a process called "incubation" in which they would relocate to a special room where the god would be able to contact them, often through dreams in which the god would either prescribe care or provide it themselves. Often the type of cure prescribed would be rather similar to the actual medical practices of physicians of the time. This type of supernatural care did not conflict with mainstream healthcare. Physicians would often recommend that patients go to a healing sanctuary when they were afflicted by an illness that the physician could not cure. This allowed the reputation of the physician to remain unharmed, as it was seen more as a referral than as a failure.

=== Stab wounds ===
Roman physicians tried their best to help treat battlefield wounds. Celsus describes treatments early Roman doctors used for battlefield abdominal wounds. Celsus describes that doctors should first observe the color of the intestines to see that if they are "...livid or pallid or black..." in which case treatment is impossible. If the large intestine is found to be cut he says treatment is unlikely to be successful but suggests suturing the intestine. Treatment of abdominal wounds should occur quickly and for fear exposed intestines would dry out. Celsus suggests adding water to the intestines to prevent this. The Romans also knew about the delicate care needed for such complex wounds. Assistants with surgical hooks were used to stitch up large abdominal wounds. They were used to help separate the margins of the abdomen because both the inner membrane and the surface skin needed to be sutured with two sets of stitches because it could be broken easily. The Romans applied a variety of ointments and dressings to these wounds. Celsus describes 34 different ones.

=== Colostrum ===
Colostrum is the first form of milk produced by lactating mammals. Both Greek and Roman medical texts prescribe the use of a variety of substances, of varying medical and religious significance. Several substances, such as sulfur, asphalt and animal excrement, were associated with the practice of human purification. The practice of using a woman's breast milk as a medicine has very early roots in Egyptian medical texts. In several such texts there are references to the use of the milk of a woman who has given birth to a male child. This practice is said to be based on depictions in several statues of the goddess Isis breastfeeding her son, the god Horus. Both Egyptian and Greek texts state that the milk used for medicinal purposes should be strictly from a woman who has borne a male child. The treatments using breast milk differed vastly between Greek and Roman culture. In Greek medicine, milk was very rarely actually consumed. Instead, it was used in recipes for ointments and washes that would treat burns and other skin-related maladies. These treatments were exclusively given to women, as women's bodies were viewed as "polluted" in some sense. In stark contrast, the Roman use of colostrum was more widespread and varied. Stories suggest that adults drinking breast milk was viewed as socially acceptable, but was not common unless used for treatment. The milk was instead ingested by the patient, and the treatment was given to both men and women, which then allowed the views of the female body to be viewed as analogous compared to their male peers, rather than as the opposites they have been for centuries before. In general, while not every single fear about the changing medical views of female physiology went away, the Romans then seemed less concerned about the so-called "pollution" of a woman's body and therefore need to have the women have special requirements needed for "purification."

It has been shown in modern times that having patients ingest mother's milk (or colostrum) is actually a rather effective treatment due to the benefits associated with it. For example, the use of colostrum has been shown to prevent the growth of Staphylococcus bacteria, which are a known cause of several types of infection. Colostrum is about half as effective as some antibiotics prescribed to patients today. Colostrum is also effective against the bacterium chlamydia. Chlamydia is a sexually transmitted disease in which some subtypes of it can cause trachoma, which is a major source of cause for severe sight impairment, if not blindness. Colostrum was a reasonably effective treatment for Chlamydia in the absence of other antibiotics.

== Diagnostic methods ==
=== Dreams ===
Dream interpretation was another avenue for treatment of illnesses by physicians. Often the interpretations of a patient's dreams would actually determine what treatment they received. A Hippocratic work titled Regimen in Acute Diseases details much of the principles outlined by Galen: specifically the humors and examples of how they could be used to prescribe treatment. The theme of this method is knowing the patient. To know how to treat a person, the physician must become familiar with and interpret the important aspects of their lives: the climate, their food intake, how much they sleep, how much they drink, any injuries. They would then draw conclusions about the patient and what must be done to set them back to equilibrium. The fourth book of the Regimen is the earliest mention of the topic of dream medicine. Dreams were used by physicians in diagnosis. They added another layer of depth to the physician's investigation of the patient. The soul was thought to serve the purpose that the brain has been discovered to serve. Sensation, pain, motion and other physiological concepts were thought to be the work of the soul. It was also thought that the soul continues the work of bodily upkeep even when a person is sleeping. Thus, dreams would show what ailed a person.

There were two types of dreams associated with medicine: prophetic and diagnostic. Prophetic dreams were divine in origin and foretold good or bad tidings for the future. Diagnostic dreams were a result of the soul telling what afflicted the body. If the dreams were of normal everyday events, their body was healthy and in equilibrium. The farther from the norm, and the more chaotic the dreams were, the more ill the patient was. The treatments that were recommended addressed what the dreams showed, and attempted to set the body right through consumption of food that carried the correct humor characteristics.

=== Astro-medicine ===
Galen wrote a treatise on diagnosis and prognosis by celestial movement. This ancient medical practice associated that disease and parts of the body were affected by the movement or location of the sun, moon and planets. This is similar to horoscopic astrology and the notion of astrological signs. These celestial signs were only a part of the process in his work Critical Days. Galen also includes that the patients' feces, urine, sputum should be examined for diagnosis. He states that examination of the excrement could indicate a disease of the respirator system, urinary tract or vascular system. Many physicians at the time believed in the association of astrology and medicine. Book III of Galen's writing he correlates the lunar phases which cause changes in the tides to also cause changes the fluid humors in the body. He also makes reference to "medical months", which are based on the two periods of the moons which are about two calendar months. There were also days that were considered critical including day seven, fourteen and day twenty which were considered favorable for a medical crisis to occur.

== Textual transmission ==
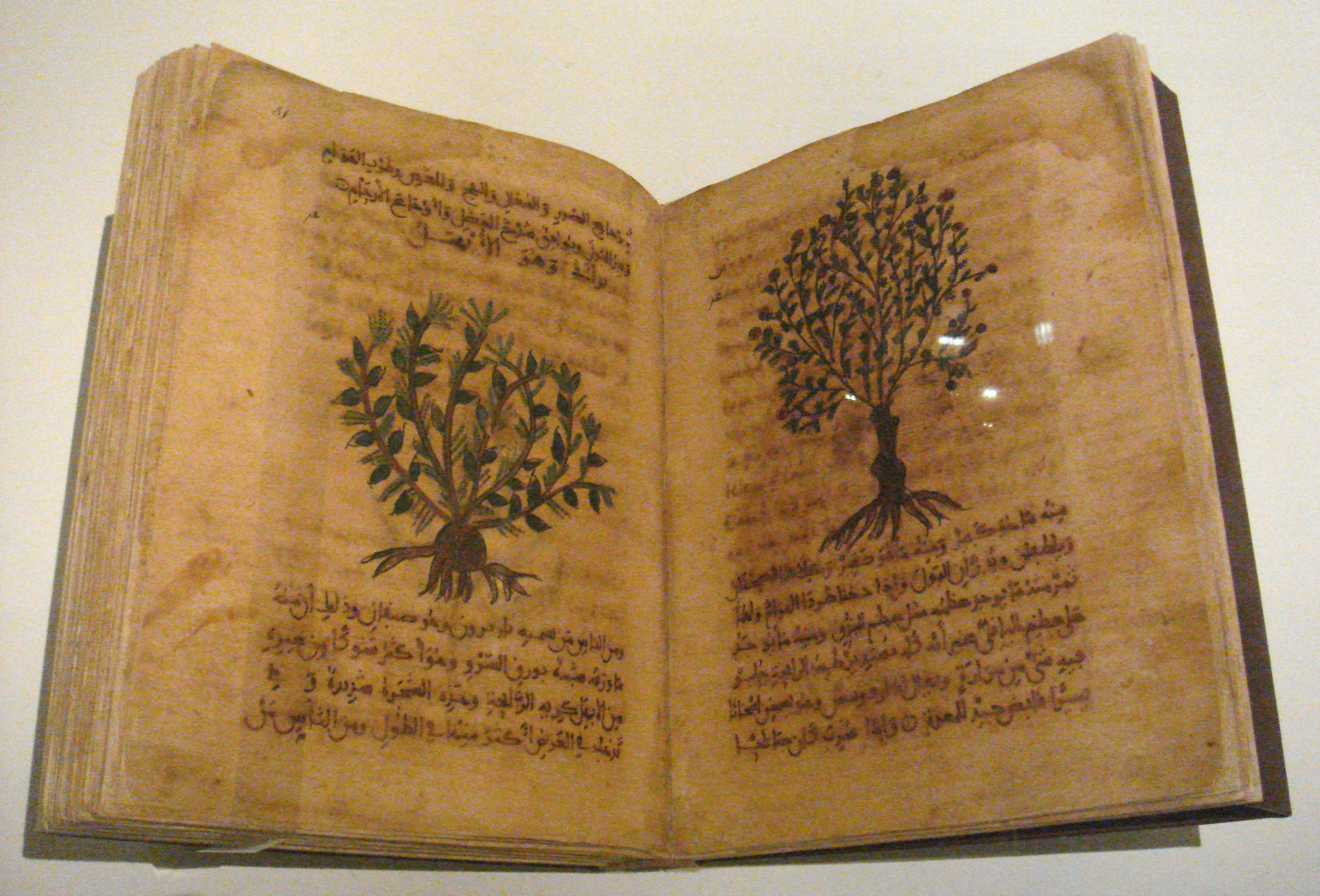
Dioscorides De materia medica in Arabic; Spain, 12th–13th century

Galenic medical texts embody the written medical tradition of classical antiquity. Little written word has survived from before that era. The volume of Galen's extant written works, however, is nearly 350 – far surpassing any other writer of the period. Prior to Galen, much of medical knowledge survived through word of mouth. The tradition of transmission and translation originated with the De materia medica, an encyclopaedia written by Pedanius Dioscorides between 50 and 70 AD. Dioscorides was a Roman physician of Greek descent. The manuscripts classified and illustrated over 1000 substances and their uses.

De materia medica influenced medical knowledge for centuries, due to its dissemination and translation into Greek, Arabic, and Latin. Galen wrote in Greek, but Arabic and Syriac translations survived as well. He referenced and challenged written works by Hippocratic physicians and authors, which gave insight into other popular medical philosophies. Herophilus, known for his texts on anatomy through dissection, and Erasistratus, also known for anatomy and physiology, survive through Galenic reference. Galen also referenced the written works of Soranus, a physician of the Methodic school known for his four-book treatise on gynecology. His synthesis of earlier medical philosophies and broad range of subjects produced the textual legacy that Galen left for the medical community for the next 1500 years.

== See also ==
- Ancient Egyptian medicine
- Ancient Greek medicine
- Byzantine medicine

== Sources ==
- Medical News Today: Ancient Roman Medicine
- Dioscorides. Translated by Osbaldeston, Tess Anne. Johannesburg: Ibidis Press. 2000. Archived from the original on 2014-09-24.
- Dean-Jones, David E. (1993). Galen On the Constitution of the Art of Medicine: Introduction, Translation, and Commentary. University of Texas, Austin. Dissertation.
- Brodersen, Kai (2015). Plinius' Kleine Reiseapotheke (Medicina Plinii, Latin and German). Stuttgart: Franz-Steiner-Verlag. ISBN 978-3-515-11026-6.
