= Diocles of Carystus =

Greek physician

Diocles of Carystus (/ˈdaɪ.əkliːz/; Greek: Διοκλῆς ὁ Καρύστιος; Latin: Diocles Carystius; also known by the Latin name Diocles Medicus, i.e. "Diocles the physician"; c. 375 BC – c. 295 BC) was a well-regarded Greek physician, born in Carystus, a city on Euboea, Greece. His significance was as a major thinker, practitioner, and writer of the fourth century.

== Life ==
Diocles lived not long after the time of Hippocrates, to whom Pliny says he was next in age and fame. Not much is known of his life, other that he lived and worked in Athens, where he wrote what may be the first medical treatise in Attic (not in Ionic as was customary in Greek medical writings). His most important work was in practical medicine, especially diet and nutrition, but he also wrote the first systematic textbook on animal anatomy. According to a number of sources, he was the first to use the word "anatomy" to describe the study. He belonged to the medical sect of the Dogmatici, and wrote several medical works, of which only the titles and some fragments remain, preserved by Galen, Caelius Aurelianus, Oribasius, Athenaeus (in the Deipnosophistae), and other ancient writers. He was the inventor of the Spoon of Diocles, a surgical instrument for the extraction of weapons or missiles such as barbed arrowheads that were embedded into the body (Greek: κυαθίσκος τοῦ Διοκλέους).

Diocles insisted that health requires an understanding of the nature of the universe and its relationship to man. Diocles emphasised that nerves are the channels of sensations and that interference with them is directly involved in the pathology of disease. There is a letter in his name addressed to king Antigonus, entitled A Letter on Preserving Health (Greek: Ἐπιστολὴ Προφυλακτική), which is inserted by Paul of Aegina at the end of the first book of his own medical compendium, and which, if genuine, was probably addressed to Antigonus II Gonatas, king of Macedon, who died in 239 BC, at the age of eighty, after a reign of forty-four years. It resembles in its subject matter several other similar letters ascribed to Hippocrates, and treats of the diet fitted for the different seasons of the year.

It used to be said that Diocles was the first to explain the difference between the veins and arteries, but this does not seem to be correct, nor is any great discovery connected with his name. His fragments have been recently collected and translated in English by Philip van der Eijk, with a commentary in a separate volume.
