= Moschion =

Moschion (Greek: Μοσχίων) is the name of:

- Moschion (tragic poet), Greek tragic poet of the 3rd century BC
- Moschion (physician), Greek physician of the 1st century AD or before, known through quotations by other medical writers
- Muscio, author of a treatise on gynecology in Latin (ca. AD 500), which was translated into Greek and known under the name Moschion
- Minor figures:
  - Moschion, Athenian sculptor mentioned in Winckelmann's History of Ancient Art
  - Moschion, notorious parasite mocked by Alexis
  - Moschion, chef employed by Demetrius Phalereus
  - Moschion, character in several plays of Menander (including Samia and Perikeiromene)
  - Moschion, paradoxographer of the 3rd or 2nd century BC (FGrHist 575) whose description of the Syracusia is quoted by Athenaeus
  - Moschion, father of Daetondas of Sicyon
