= Women's medicine in antiquity =

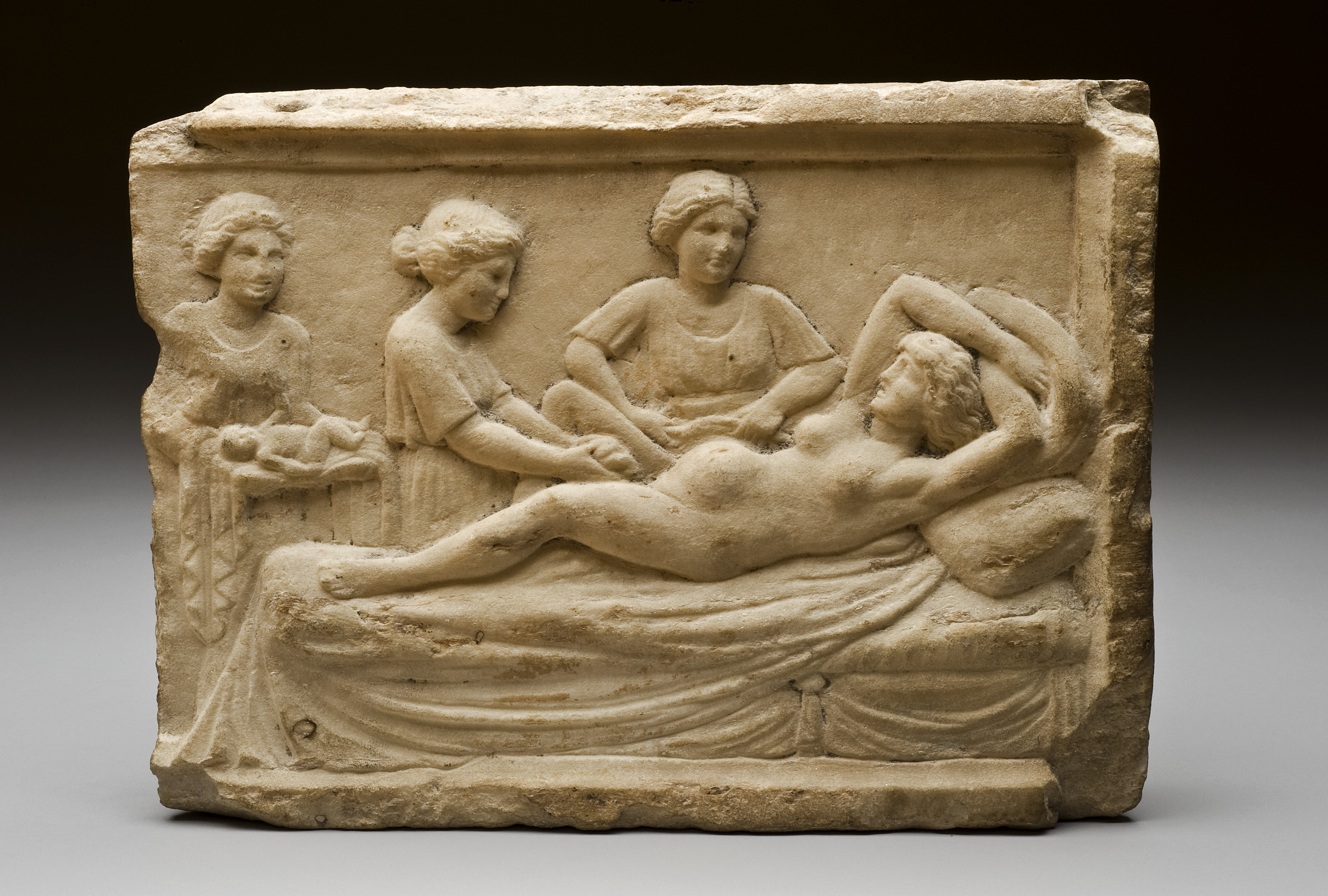
Marble relief from Ostia Antica showing a childbirth scene

Childbirth and obstetrics in classical antiquity (here meaning the ancient Greco-Roman world) were studied by the physicians of ancient Greece and Rome. Their ideas and practices during this time endured in Western medicine for centuries and many themes are seen in modern women's health. Classical gynecology and obstetrics were originally studied and taught mainly by midwives in the ancient world, but eventually scholarly physicians of both sexes became involved as well. Obstetrics is traditionally defined as the surgical specialty dealing with the care of a woman and her offspring during pregnancy, childbirth and the puerperium (recovery). Gynecology involves the medical practices dealing with the health of women's reproductive organs (vagina, uterus, ovaries) and breasts.

Midwifery and obstetrics are different but overlap in medical practice that focuses on pregnancy and labor. Midwifery emphasizes the normality of pregnancy along with the reproductive process. Classical Antiquity saw the beginning of attempts to classify various areas of medical research, and the terms gynecology and obstetrics came into use. The Hippocratic Corpus, a large collection of treatises attributed to Hippocrates, features a number of gynecological treatises, which date to the classical period.

== Women as doctors ==
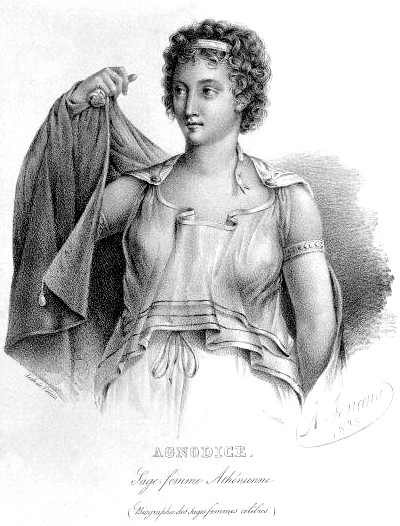
A modern engraving of Agnodice, a midwife and obstetrician, who according to legend disguised herself as a man in order to practice as a doctor

During the era of Classical Antiquity, women practiced as doctors, but they were by far in the minority and typically confined to only gynecology and obstetrics. Aristotle was an important influence on later medical writers in Greece and eventually Europe. Similar to the writers of the Hippocratic Corpus, Aristotle concluded that women's physiology was fundamentally different from that of men primarily because women were physically weaker, and therefore more prone to symptoms caused in some way by weakness, such as the theory of humourism. This belief claimed that both men and women had several "humours" regulating their physical health, and that women had a "cooler" humour. The Hippocratic Corpus writers indicated that men were more rational than women, and that women's physiology made them susceptible to problems that would cause symptoms of irrationality. Continuing with this assumption that men were more rational, men dominated the profession of physicians, an occupation requiring rational research, and for which they believed women were not suited.

This did not stop women from becoming physicians. Philista was a popular professor of medicine who delivered lectures from behind a curtain, to prevent her beauty from distracting her students. In ancient Greece, there was also an opportunity for midwives to receive some further medical training, to become a doctor-midwife, called in the Hellenistic, Roman and Byzantine eras as iatromea (ιατρομαία).

Women doctors may have offered specializations beyond gynecology and obstetrics, but there is not enough information to know how frequently. As obstetricians and gynecologists, they appear to have been numerous. The Code of Justinian presumed women doctors to be primarily obstetricians. The first medical text known to be written by a woman is by Metrodora, Concerning the Feminine Diseases of the Womb.

During Classical Antiquity, anyone could be trained as a doctor at one of the many medical schools/hospitals, the Asclepeieon. Training involved mainly practical applications as well as forming an apprenticeship to other doctors. During the Hellenistic era, the Library of Alexandria also served as a medical school, where research and training would take place on the body of the diseased. It also appears that the children, male or female, of famous doctors, would also follow the medical profession, continuing the family tradition. For example, Pantheia, who was the wife of a physician, became one herself, a pattern also seen in the careers of Aurelia Alexandria Zosime and Auguste. Auguste received recognition as a chief doctor of her city, a title her husband also received. Metilia Donata was prominent enough to commission a large public building in Lyon. Anthiochis of Tlos, the daughter of a prominent physician, Diodotus, was recognized by the council of Tlos for her work as a doctor and had a statue of herself erected. She was also a widely discussed expert cited by Galen and others. Aspasia is quoted extensively by Aetius on gynecology.

This Greco-Roman approach differs greatly from other ancient civilizations, where women's roles as medical specialists concerning gynecology and obstetrics were apparently unquestioned. Medical schools attached to temples in ancient Egypt were numerous, including well-known medical schools for women at Heliopolis and Sais, where women are also believed to have been the professors.

== Breast cancer ==
Hippocrates was the first to use the term cancer to describe the hard lesions occasionally found in women's breasts. He reasoned that the lesions were caused by problems with the woman's uterus and menstrual cycle. Symptoms of these lesions were believed to be pain, appetite loss, bitter taste, and confusion. Hippocrates urged against surgery as a treatment for breast cancer because he considered it harmful and found that the prognosis was much better for women who did not have the lesions removed or treated. In his later work Diseases of Women, Hippocrates furthers the list of late-stage cancer symptoms by including deliria, dehydration, dry nipples, loss of sense of smell, and shallow breathing.

Galen considered breast cancer to be a result of excess black bile in the body, referencing to Hippocrates' theory of the humoral theory of diseases. He hypothesized that a women's menstrual period was a method of removing black bile from the body. This idea fit his observation that it more common for women in menopause and pre-menopause to develop breast lesions. Unlike Hippocrates, Galen encouraged surgical removal of tumors and even prescribed special diets and purgation to rid the body of excess black bile.

== Infertility ==
Aristotle formulated early tests for infertility by placing scented cloth in a woman's vagina for an extended amount of time and determining whether the aroma came out of the mouth or if the eyes or saliva was colored. This test determined whether or not the woman's semen passes were open or closed. Hippocrates formed a similar test by observing whether a scent would pass through a woman's body out of her mouth when the smell was produced between her legs while she was wrapped in a blanket. Hippocrates further tested for infertility by putting red stone in a woman's eyes and determining if it penetrated through.

== Midwifery ==
During antiquity, there was no profession equal to that of our modern day nurse. No ancient medical sources discuss any sort of trained nursing personnel assisting doctors. However, many texts mention the use of slaves or members of a doctor's family as assistants. The closest similarity to that of a nurse during antiquity was a midwife. Midwifery flourished in ancient civilizations, including Egypt, Byzantium, Mesopotamia, and the Mediterranean empires of Greece and Rome.

There were doctors within the Greco-Roman world who wrote favourably of midwifery. Herophilus wrote a manual for midwives, which advanced their status. This was followed by the work of the Greek Soranus of Ephesus (98–138 AD), who was widely translated into Latin, and Galen. Soranus was an important gynecologist and is credited with four books describing the female anatomy. He also discussed methods to deal with difficult births, such as using forceps. He also outlined a series of criteria for woman to be an eligible midwife. He wrote:

A suitable person…must be literate to be able to comprehend the art through theory too. She must have her wits about her so that she may easily follow what is said and what is happening. She must have a good memory to retain the imparted instructions (for knowledge arises from memory of what has been grasped). She must love work, to preserve through all vicissitudes (for a woman who wishes to acquire such vast knowledge needs manly patience).

The most qualified midwife would be trained in all branches of therapy. She should be able to prescribe hygienic regulations for her patients, observe the general and individual features of the case, give advice by recalling from previous knowledge what medical decisions would work in every case and to be reassuring to her patients. It is not necessary for her to have had a child to deliver another woman’s child, but it is good if she has been in labor to enhance sympathy with the mother.

To obtain good midwifery habits, she will be well disciplined and always sober, have a quiet disposition sharing many life secrets, must not be greedy for money, be free of superstition to not overlook salutary measures, keeping her hands soft by staying away from wool-working as this may harden her hands and use ointments to acquire softness. She too needs to be respectable, the people of the household will have to trust her within their household, may not be handicapped in the performance of her work. Long and slim fingers with short nails are necessary to touch deep-lying inflammation without causing too much pain. Midwives that acquire of all these will be the best midwives.

This instruction manual for midwives served as a reference text and reflects the role midwives filled in society.

== Birth control and abortion ==
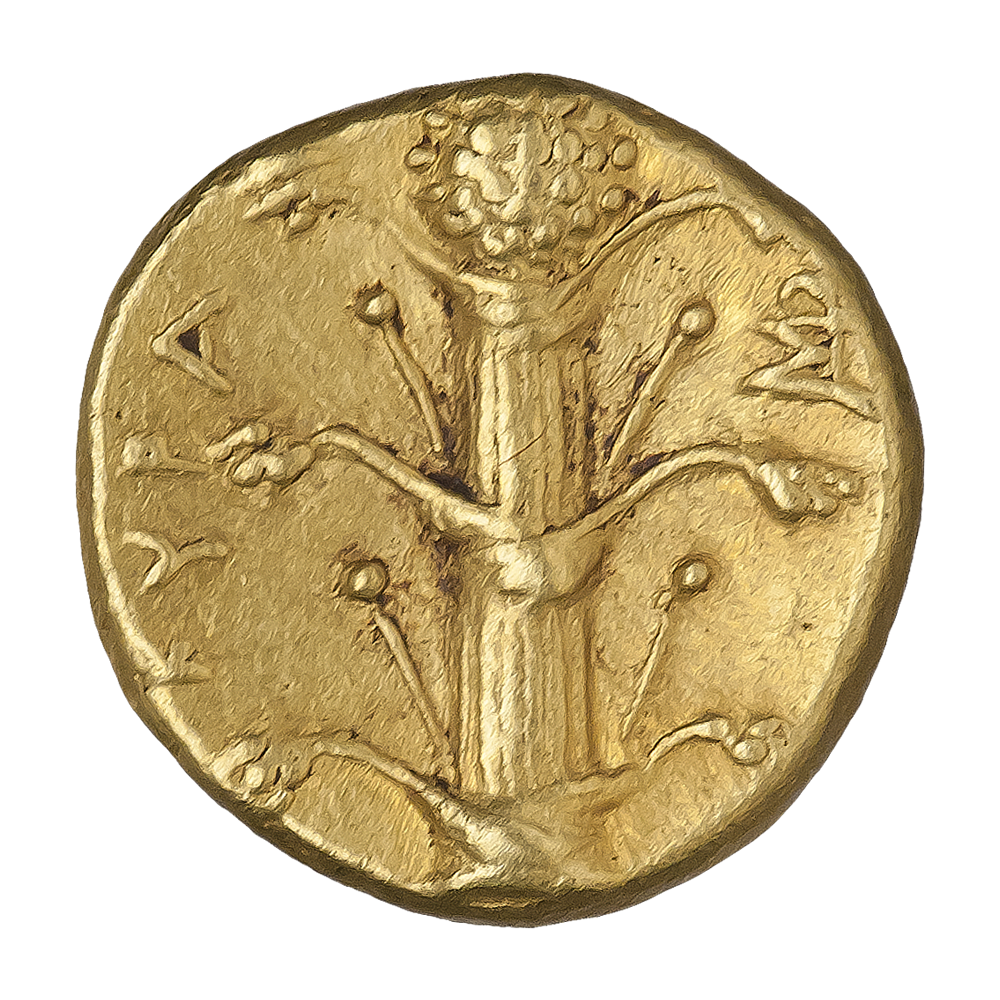
Ancient coin from Cyrene depicting a silphium stalk

Women practiced birth control in antiquity mainly through their knowledge of plants and herbs. Their knowledge was transmitted by herders who observed sterility of their livestock when exposed to certain plants. Knowledge of birth control was also transmitted by word of mouth, mainly originating from knowledgeable midwives. Midwives knew how to identify necessary plants, how to administer them, and most importantly, when to administer them in relation to the last menstruation or coitus.

A very popular plant used for birth control by the Greeks was Silphium. It is a giant fennel-like herb which was filled with a pungent sap and offered a rich flavor. The plant was so widely used that it appeared on a Cyrenian coin as a woman touched the plant with one hand and pointed to her genitals with the other. The demand for the plant was so great that by the fourth century, it had gone extinct. It is believed that the heart shape originated from the seed of this plant as they are the same shape and the plant was associated with love, romance, and sexuality.

Although Silphium was most popular, there were many other plants and herbs used. Another plant used was pennyroyal, an abortifacient. Although toxic, pennyroyal was consumed in small dosages in tea because it contained the abortive substance pulegone. A medical document dating back to 1500 BC in Egypt includes a list of substances used as birth control. One substance involved making a paste from acacia gum, dates, fiber, honey, and other unidentified plants to create a sort of spermicide. Early physicians Galen and Dioscorides believed that women would consume willow and pomegranate kernels to prevent pregnancy as well.

Soranus of Ephesus advocated for the application of ointments made of old olive oil, honey, cedar resin, and white lead on the cervix in order block the opening to the uterus. However, Soranus believed birth control was most effective when oral contraceptives were combined with certain procedures. Soranus recommended that women should avoid having intercourse during their fertile period in their cycle, as well as avoid deep penetration. After intercourse, women were urged to squat, sneeze, and cleanse the vagina before drinking something cold. If these combined practices failed in the prevention of pregnancy, recipes including small amounts of Cyrenaic juice, diluted wine, leukoion, and white pepper were prescribed to induce abortion.

According to the Hippocratic Corpus, there were oral alternatives used to induce abortion such as chaste tree (Vitex agnus-castus), copper, and Ferula species. Plato explored the control that midwives perhaps had during this process:

And furthermore, the midwives, by means of drugs [149d] and incantations, are able to arouse the pangs of labor and, if they wish, to make them milder, and to cause those to bear who have difficulty in bearing; and they cause miscarriages if they think them desirable.

— Plato: Theaetus (excerpts)

== Pregnancy ==
There were many theories used to determine whether a woman was pregnant during antiquity. A popular method involved examining the vessels of her breasts. A second method involved sitting a woman on a beer and date mash covered floor and using a proportionality equation according to the number of times she vomits. Another method included inserting an onion into a woman's vagina and determining whether or not it could be smelled from her breath. Although there is little evidence as to whether or not any of these methods were confirmed medical procedures or if they were just folklore.

== Labor and delivery ==
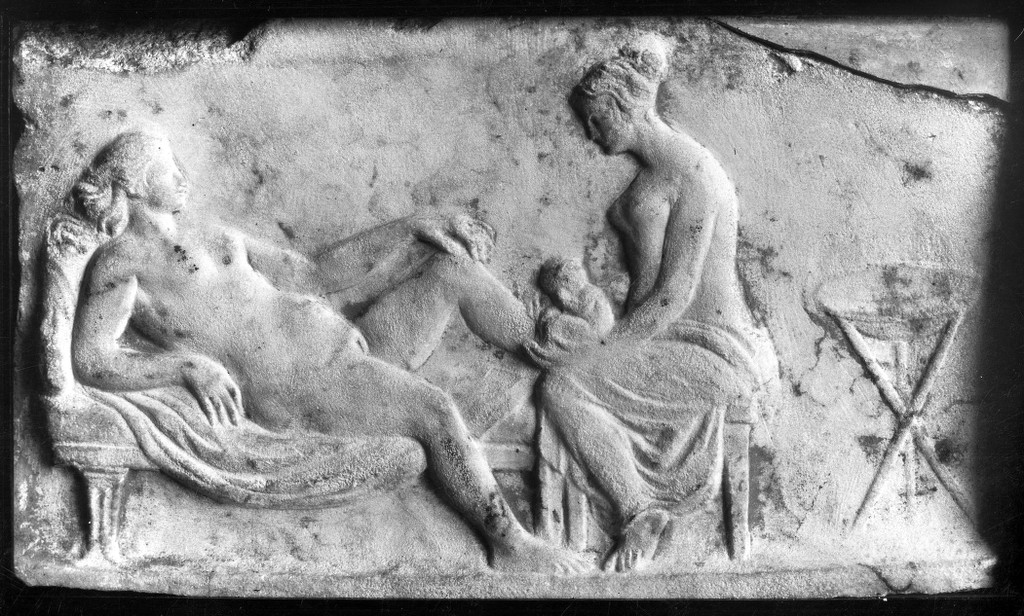
Ancient Roman relief carving of a midwife attending a woman giving birth

Hospitals did not exist during antiquity so delivery took place in the home of the expectant mother with a midwife and other assistants to the midwife. Religion played a major role during labor and delivery. Women called upon Artemis, a goddess with the ability to bring new life into the world as well as the ability to take it away. Though she remained a virgin herself, it was said that she witnessed the pain of her mother during the birth of her brother, Apollo, and immediately assumed the position of midwife. If a woman died during childbirth, her clothes were taken to the temple of Artemis due to the fact the woman's death was attributed to her. If the birth was successful, the mother would make an offering of thanks by sacrificing some of her clothes to the goddess as well.

Herbs and other plants were used heavily in the delivery process, a practice also linked to religious belief. For example, a drink sprinkled with powdered sow’s dung was given to relieve labor pain, and fumigation with the fat from a hyena was thought to produce immediate delivery. Most of these practices had little to no medical efficacy, but they did probably provide some placebo effect. Despite the attempt to use science in advancing medical knowledge, the experimentation and teachings of the Hippocratic Corpus were not necessarily more effective than the traditional customs of midwifery. For example, the Hippocratic writers believed that the womb could move out of place and cause health problems, and the prescribed treatment was to coax the displaced womb back into place using sweet-smelling herbs.

Soranus described three main stages of pregnancy: conception, which regarded keeping the male seed within the womb; pica, which occurred 40 days into pregnancy and included symptoms of nausea and cravings for extraordinary foods. During this phase women were also instructed to exercise and sleep more to build up strength as preparation for the labor process. The final stage of pregnancy was described as the labor and the process of delivery. In preparation for labor, the woman was advised to bathe in wine and sweet-water baths to calm her mind before delivery. Her belly was then rubbed with oils to decrease the appearance of stretch marks, and her genitals were anointed with herbs and injected with softeners such as goose fat.

The role of the midwife was very important during the process of childbirth and Soranus described her role in great detail. For example, the midwife was to have certain tools to ensure a safe delivery, including: clean olive oil, sea sponges, pieces of wool bandages to cradle the infant, a pillow, strong smelling herbs in case of fainting, and a birthing stool. A birthing stool is a chair from which the seat has been removed.

The midwife would ready her supplies as labor began. During the labor process, the mother would lie on her back on a hard, low bed with support under her hips. Her thighs were parted with her feet drawn up. Gentle massage was implemented to ease labor pains as cloths soaked in warm olive oil were laid over her stomach and genital area. Against the woman's sides were placed hot compresses in the form of warm oil-filled bladders.

During the actual birth, the mother would be moved to the birthing stool, where she was seated or would squat on two large bricks with a midwife in front of her and female aides standing at her sides. In a normal headfirst delivery, the cervical opening was stretched slightly, and the rest of the body was pulled out. Soranus instructed the midwife to wrap her hands in pieces of cloth or thin papyrus so that the slippery newborn did not slide out of her grasp.

== Caesarian sections ==
A widely cited myth claims that the word "caesarian" possibly derives from the ancient Roman ruler Julius Caesar, because it was believed that Caesar was delivered through this procedure. The oldest reference to this myth is a passage from the Suda, a 10th-century Byzantine encyclopedia. The myth is a misinterpretation of a passage from Pliny the Elder's Natural History, which mentions a "Caesar" (one of the ancestors of Julius Caesar) being cut from his mother's womb. This practice is probably much older than Julius Caesar, and "C-sections", as performed by the Romans, were done to rescue the baby from a dying or already dead mother, and were performed post-mortem. The fact that Julius Caesar's mother Aurelia Cotta lived for decades after Caesar's birth makes this etymology highly unlikely. Pliny mentions another more widely accepted possibility for the etymology of the word “caesarian”, claiming that it derives from the Latin word caedere, meaning “to cut”.

Rabbinical discussions recorded in the Mishnah suggest that Jews in the Roman period may have successfully practiced caesarians on living mothers who were not in danger of dying. Greeks and Egyptians did not perform C-sections, either post-mortem or on living mothers. However, Greeks would have had at least some knowledge of the Caesarian operation and the procedure involved. The Greek god Aesclepius was fabled to have been extracted from his mother's womb through this procedure.

Other than the evidence of Jews practicing C-sections in antiquity (very little in ancient Rome, even less in ancient Greece), not much more evidence exists regarding Caesarian-operation birth. One reason could have been that C-sections were not performed very often because of medical complications or superstitions surrounding C-sections. In early Christian Rome, C-sections were almost non-existent. Loss of skill is a possibility for the lack of C-sections. Infant mortality rates were high in antiquity, so C-sections certainly could have been useful. However, early Christian doctors could have disregarded C-sections as a socially acceptable operation because of religious beliefs. Disease, a perceived need for secrecy, and social discouragement could have also been factors that lead to the decline in C-sections among early Christians in Rome. Almost no evidence exists for C-sections in the Christian world until the 10th century.

The lack of education for women and the social norm that women remained in the private sphere of life (as opposed to public) is theorized to also have contributed to a shortage of C-sections.

== Death and childbirth ==
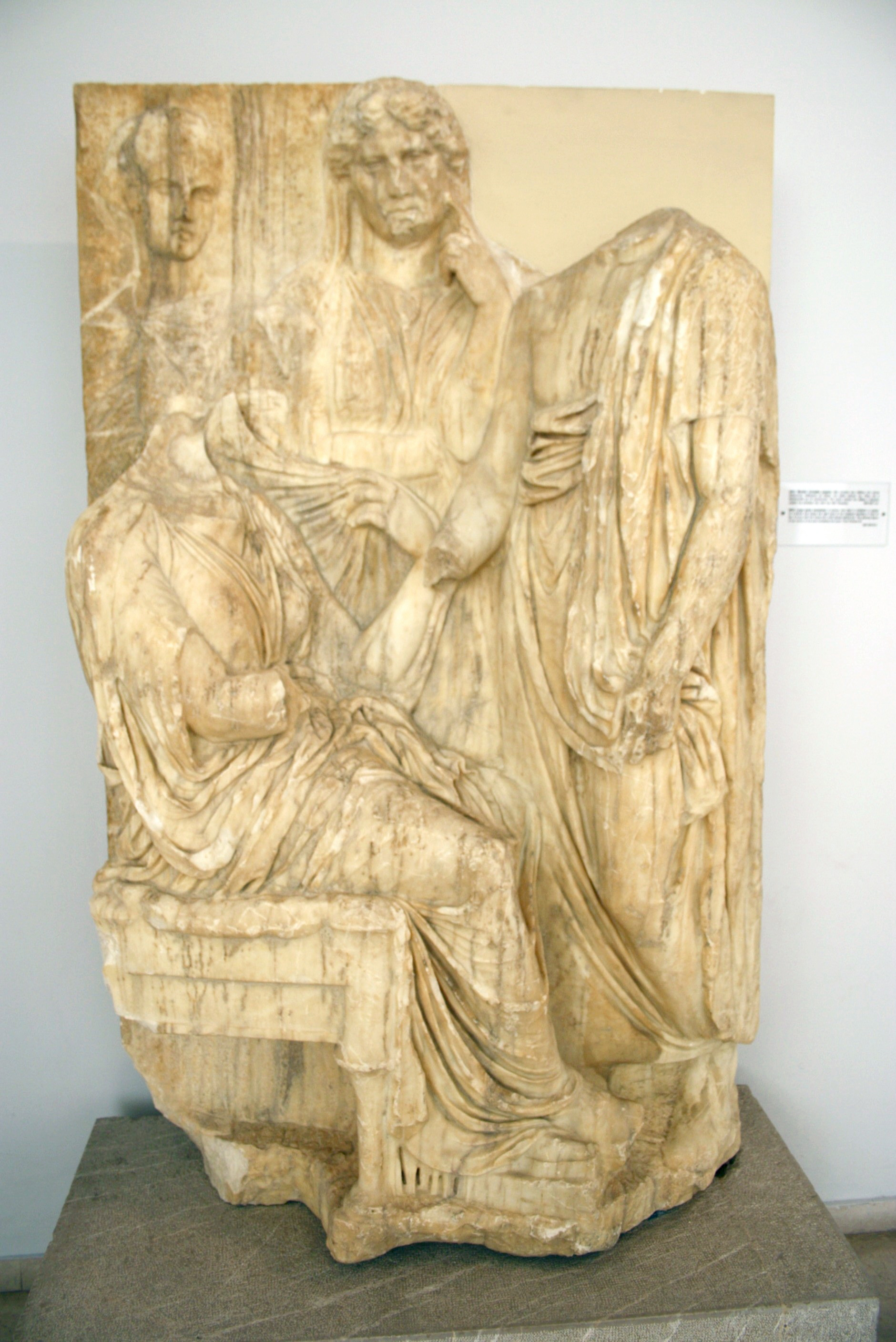
Greek Attic funerary stele, showing a seated woman who died in childbirth bidding farewell to her husband, mother and newborn's nurse, c. 350–330 BC

Mortality was quite high in antiquity due to a few factors: a lack of sanitation and hygienic awareness, no understanding of micro-organisms, and a dearth of effective drugs. In the context of childbirth, maternal and infant mortality were exponentially raised compared to modern standards. This resulted from the toll childbirth took on women, and the increased risk of infection following labor.

=== Maternal mortality ===
Maternal mortality figures are available only through comparison. Maternal mortality is thought to be comparable with figures for similar, but much later, societies with more surviving records, such as eighteenth-century rural England, where maternal mortality averaged 25 per 1,000 births.

=== Infant mortality ===
The question of infant mortality in antiquity is complicated by infanticide and exposure, neither of which reflect on medical ability during the period. The former does this through intentional death of the child, and the latter through abandonment, and possible death. These reflect instead on social conditions and norms. While valuable, this is not the information sought, and scholars having painstakingly attempted to eliminate the 'noise' from their inquiries.

Much like maternal mortality, it is difficult to construct actual figures of the infant mortality rate in antiquity, but comparisons have been made between ancient societies and modern non-industrialized societies. The figures suggest that they are comparable with those of modern industrialized societies to put them in perspective. While infant mortality is less than 10 per 1,000 in modern industrialized societies, non-industrialized societies display rates from 50 to 200+ per 1,000. Scholarship using model life tables and assuming life expectancy at birth of 25 years produces the figure of 300 per 1,000 for Roman society.

== See also ==
- Ancient Egyptian medicine
- Cleopatra the Physician
- Gynecology in ancient Rome
- Women in ancient Egypt
- Women in medicine
