= Moschion (physician) =

Moschion, (Greek: Μοσχίων), is a physician quoted by Soranus, Andromachus, and Asclepiades Pharmacion, who lived in or before the 1st century. He may be the same person who was called the "Corrector" (Greek: Διορθωτής), because though he was one of the followers of Asclepiades of Bithynia, he ventured to controvert his opinions on some points.

A physician of the same name is mentioned also by Soranus, Plutarch, Alexander of Tralles, Aëtius Pliny, and Tertullian.

In Byzantine times, a Latin treatise on gynecology by an otherwise unknown Muscio was translated into Greek; this author came to be wrongly identified with Moschion.
