= Gynecology in ancient Rome =

Modern historians' knowledge of ancient Roman gynecology and obstetrics primarily comes from Soranus of Ephesus' four-volume treatise on gynecology. His writings covered medical conditions such as uterine prolapse and cancer and treatments involving materials such as herbs and tools such as pessaries. Ancient Roman doctors believed that menstruation was designed to rid the female body of excess fluids. They believed that menstrual blood had special powers. Roman doctors may also have noticed conditions such as premenstrual syndrome.

== Uterine prolapse ==
Uterine prolapse occurs when the uterus (the end of which is also known as the cervix) begins to fall (prolapse) into the vaginal canal. In severe cases, a Uterine prolapse can protrude from the vagina. . It is possible that this condition was the origin of the belief that the womb could move around. Ancient Roman gynecologists treated this condition by suspending the patient upside down from a ladder. This treatment was not universally accepted by ancient Roman doctors. Soranus of Ephesus criticized this treatment method. Another treatment at the time involved wrapping aetites, which were magic stones used to protect the fetus and ease childbirth, in the skin of sacrificed animals. The only known mention of a hysterectomy comes from the work Gynecology. Soranus writes that a woman with an inverted uterus infected with gangrene had her uterus and bladder removed.

== Cancer ==
Ancient Roman physicians noticed that breast cancer and ovarian cancer occurred more frequently in some families than others. Galen believed that menstruation would rid a woman of their black bile, and therefore could cure melancholia, which is a historical term for depression. Galen concluded that menopause, or the cessation of the menstrual cycle, would lead to an excess of black bile and therefore breast cancer. The treatment for breast cancer consisted of bloodletting and cupping therapy. Aulus Celsus described the stages of breast cancer in his treatise De Medicina. In the first stage, when the cancer was limited to a lesion, caustics were used, followed by an incision, then cauterization. This stage was called cacoethes. Celsus considered this treatment effective only in the early stages. During the later ones it was thought to merely hasten the patient's death. While Celsus did not advocate for the removal of the pectoral muscles, Galen believed the only way to get rid of breast cancer was to excise all infected regions from the body. Cervical cancer was believed to be a disease that primarily affected married women, widows, and prostitutes. It was also believed that nuns and virgins would remain unaffected. The Romans' association between cervical cancer and frequent sexual intercourse may have been because a virus known as human papillomavirus is known to cause cervical cancer and is sexually transmitted.

== Pregnancy ==
=== Abortion and contraceptives ===
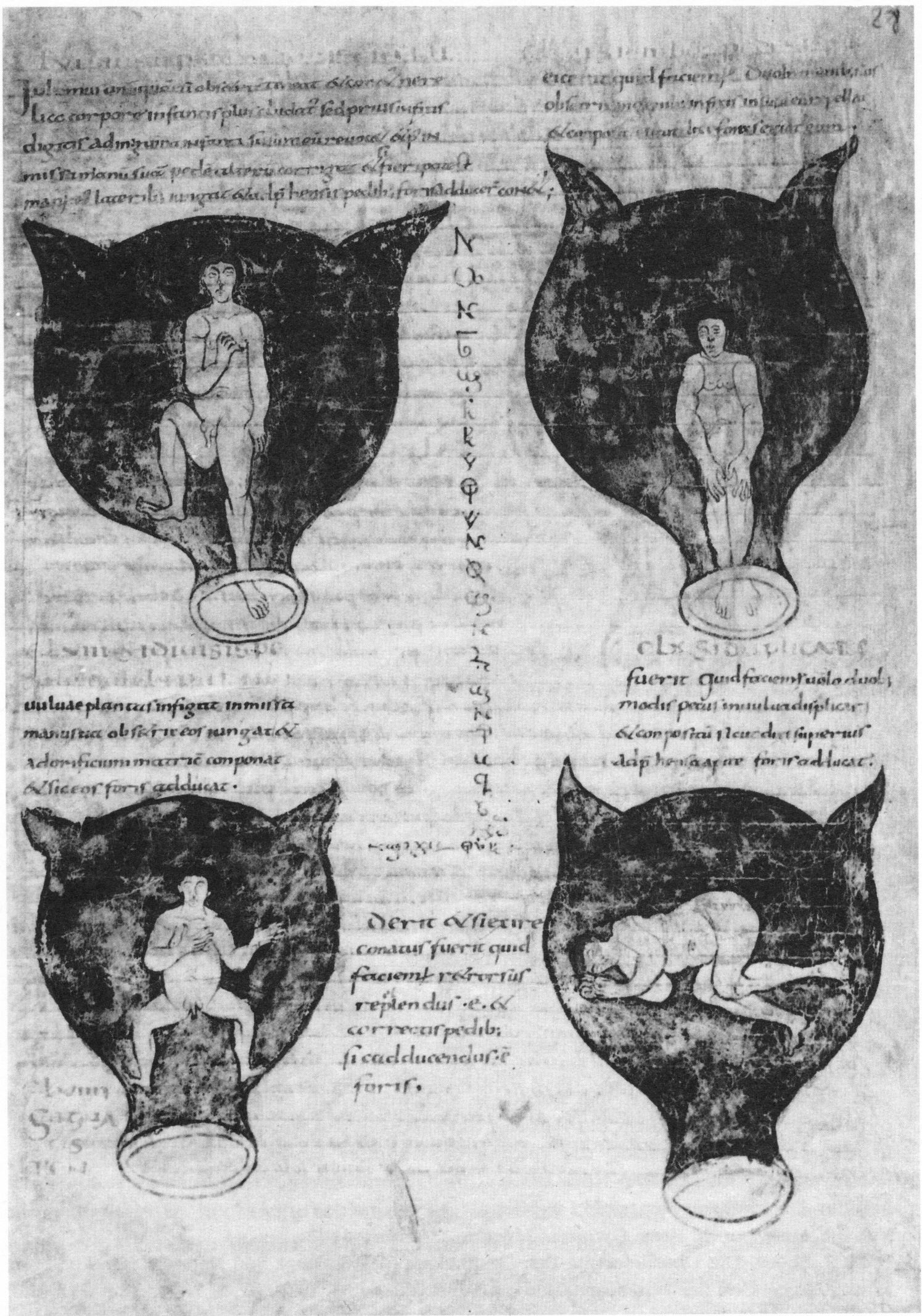
Illustration of embryo in a medieval reproduction of Soranus' treatise

There were surgical procedures for abortion in ancient Rome, but they were rarely used, and most abortions were conducted using herbs or other drugs. According to Pliny the Elder, Ecballium elaterium was the most effective abortifacient. The plant was also recorded to have functioned as emmenagogue, an herb that induces menstrual flow. Dacus carota may have also been valued as an effective abortifacient; the plant continued to be used into the Middle Ages. Dioscorides states that when inserted like a pessary or consumed as a drink, it can stimulate menstrual flow. Glechium, or pennyroyal, was also a contraceptive in ancient Rome. When taken as a drink, the plant was also believed to increase menstrual flow. Other Roman medical writers, Quintus Serenus Sammonicus and Aspasia the Physician, stated that Glechium only functioned as an emmenagogue when served in tepid water. In On the Diseases of Women, it is mentioned that when the plant is consumed alongside wine, it can induce abortions. One of the most popular abortifacient herbs in ancient Rome was Silphium, a plant native to Cyrene. Cyrene developed an industry centered around selling the drug; merchants who sold it amassed large sums of wealth and Cyrenian currency bore images of the plant. According to Soranus, the plant could function as a contraceptive and as an abortifacient. Soranus also mentions that upsetting or damaging the stomach and "congestion of the head" can appear as side effects of silphium. According to the ancient gynecological text On the Diseases of Women, silphium should be mixed with pepper, bull bile, rue, and asphaltum and crushed into a powder before being consumed. Pepper and myrrh were also mixed with Aristolochia clematitis to create another herbal abortifacient and emmenagogue. Another expensive abortifacient in ancient Rome was the "Balm of Gilead", a plant native to Gilead. Pliny claimed that the plant was "worth double its weight in silver". Dioscorides, who called it "balsamum", stated that it functions as an abortifacient, stimulates menstrual flow, and expels the placenta. Soranus claimed that it also serves as a contraceptive, however only when the juice of the "balsam tree" was smeared over the orifice of the uterus.

Other herbal remedies were theorized to function exclusively as contraceptives. Soranus claims that rubbing old olive oil, honey, and sometimes wool, onto the cervix could cause it to clot, closing it and preventing pregnancy. Soranus further suggests that white lead mixed with balsam sap or cedar and then combined with a clump of wool could inhibit pregnancy. Such a concoction likely functioned as an effective contraceptive due to the effects of lead poisoning, which can lead to miscarriage, infertility, or birth defects. Various folk medicines also served as contraceptives in ancient Rome. Soranus claims that drinking a cold beverage prior to sexual intercourse could cool down the uterus, causing it close and block sperm. Soranus believed that sperm was hot, and would therefore be rejected by a cooler uterus. Another contraceptive technique described by Soranus involves cleaning the uterus of the sperm. Soranus believed that if a woman held their breath and pulled away before their partner ejaculated, the sperm would be prevented from embedding itself deep inside the vagina. Afterwards, Soranus advised women to squat down whilst sneezing and wipe the sperm off, preventing insemination. The Latin poet Lucretius described a similar contraceptive method in his work, De rerum natura; he claims that "whores", or, in Latin, "scorta", utilize a technique by which they pull away before their partner climaxes. Lucretius lambasts this technique, claiming that it is reserved for those who wish to avoid pregnancy whilst pleasuring their clients. Pliny describes another folk contraceptive; he writes that if a woman decapitated a hairy spider and removed two worms from its carcass, she could then tie them around her waist with deer hide. This ritual was believed to protect a woman from pregnancy for around a year.

When surgery was used, it involved the usage of surgical instruments to penetrate the mother. Usually, this procedure ended with both the fetus' and the mother's death. Soranus advised that in the next 30 days following conception, woman should physically strain their bodies to ensure an abortion. Soranus recommended women carry heavy objects, exercise, purge, and eat unhealthy foods as part of this phase of the treatment. In the next phase of treatment, women were instructed to take baths and poultices or enemas, all of which were mixed with herbs such as mallow, wormwood, rue, or linseed. For the final stage, women were subjected to pessaries or bleeding; Soranus cautioned against any intensive bloodletting to avoid damaging the body. Ancient Roman doctors, including Soranus, believed that abortion was forbidden by the Hippocratic Oath, which forbade giving a woman "a pessary to cause abortion". According to Soranus, the only exception was when pregnancy threatened the life of the mother. Both Galen, a Greek doctor, and Hippocrates described the usage of pelvic floor muscle training, now known as Kegel exercises, to treat urinary incontinence. These techniques were theorized to be beneficial for one's physical, spiritual, and sexual health.

=== Childbirth ===
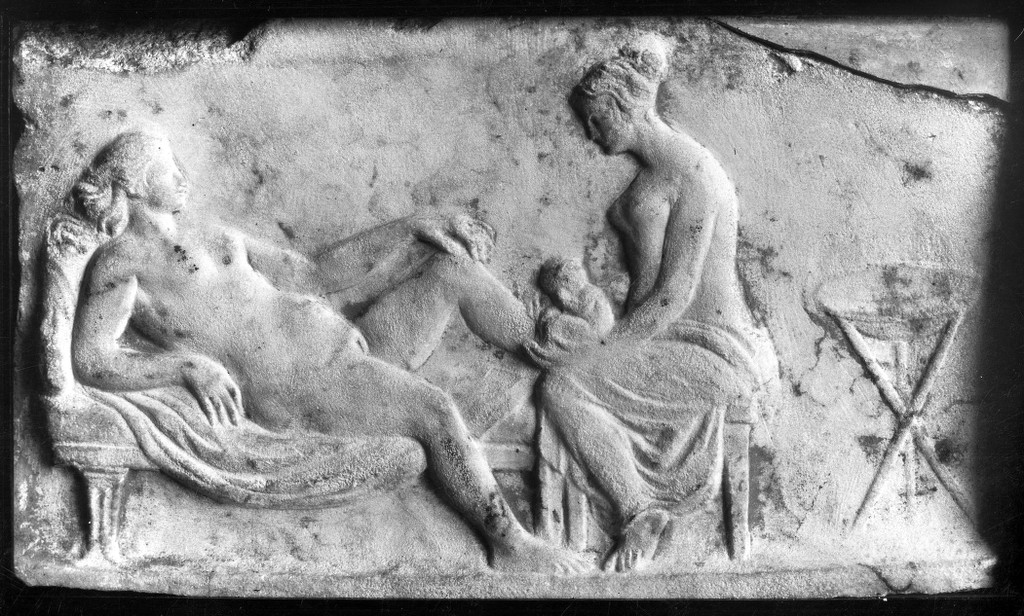
A Roman midwife aiding a woman in giving birth

Soranus believed that following menarche, the first menstrual cycle, a woman was physically mature enough to bear children. He believed that women were at their most fertile at the ends of each menstrual cycle because the vagina was moist and warm, but no longer congested. Soranus further believed that proper mental health was essential for fertility; he argued the body and soul must be in healthy condition for pregnancy to occur. According to Soranus, pregnancy and childbirth drained the vitality of the mother; he compared this process to the exhaustion of trees when burdened with excessive fruit-production. Thus, he argued, that relaxation and the avoidance of physically or emotionally strenuous activities was crucial for maintaining proper health in pregnancy.

In ancient Rome childbirth had a high maternal mortality rate; modern scholars estimate that 17 women died in childbirth for every 1,000 births. Pregnancy-related complications, such as a uterine hemorrhage, were far more common in the ancient world. Young ages of marriage may have also increased the likelihood of complications in childbirth. Roman doctors believed that the fetus could be injured through a "faulty fetus". Ancient gynecologists also believed that the fetus could harm the mother's health. Hippocrates divided gestation into forty-day periods. The first period represented the time when the risk of miscarriage was the highest; during the last forty days, the fetus was thought to be the most active. Soranus wrote that during pregnancy women began craving to eat materials such as charcoal.

Midwives were an important part of Roman childbirth care; archaeological evidence affirms the existence of a widespread and prominent midwife industry. Epitaphs dedicated to midwives typically advertise their perceived "wifely virtues" rather than their capabilities as medical professionals. Soranus recommends that three midwives be present to aid the mother during childbirth. The midwives were instructed to deliver the mother lying down to reduce pain and anxiety. Soranus advises midwives to avoid staring at the genitalia of the mother, as Soranus claims this can cause their body to contract out of shame. Soranus details the criteria for the selection and training of skilled midwives. He argues that competent midwives require literacy, proficiency in both medical theory and gynecological techniques, as well as adequate physical health. Soranus believed that mental characteristics were fundamental to a competent midwife: Midwives must be calm, fearless, supportive, and sympathetic with their patients. Unlike some of his contemporaries, Soranus did not believe that previous experience giving birth was mandatory for a midwife. According to Soranus, other Roman doctors believed that previous experience with childbirth was necessary to ensure the midwife could properly sympathize with the mother during the pain of childbirth. Soranus disagreed with these assessments, arguing that such sympathy was not restricted to those with prior childbirth experience. Compassion was lauded by Soranus as an essential characteristic of proper childcare. He recommended that wet nurses also possess sympathy; Soranus claimed that wet nurses lacking in these traits will be inattentive, failing to properly care for the baby and its needs. It is unclear if most Roman midwives fit these criteria. Muscio, a writer of a 6th-century gynecological treatise, describes using "women's words" in his text so poorly educated midwives could understand his work. Such claims indicate that a sizeable portion of midwives contemporary to Muscio may have been illiterate.

Roman medical care, including care for childbirth, was not entirely distinct from Roman religion. Amulets and other magical items were used to ensure the mother would give birth on time. Healing inscriptions from the temple of Epidaurus often record a female patient seeking divine intervention for gynecological concerns such as infertility, reproductive issues, or childbirth. It was believed that numerous pregnancies, oversized embryos, or excessive stretching can deform the uterus, leading to reproductive issues.

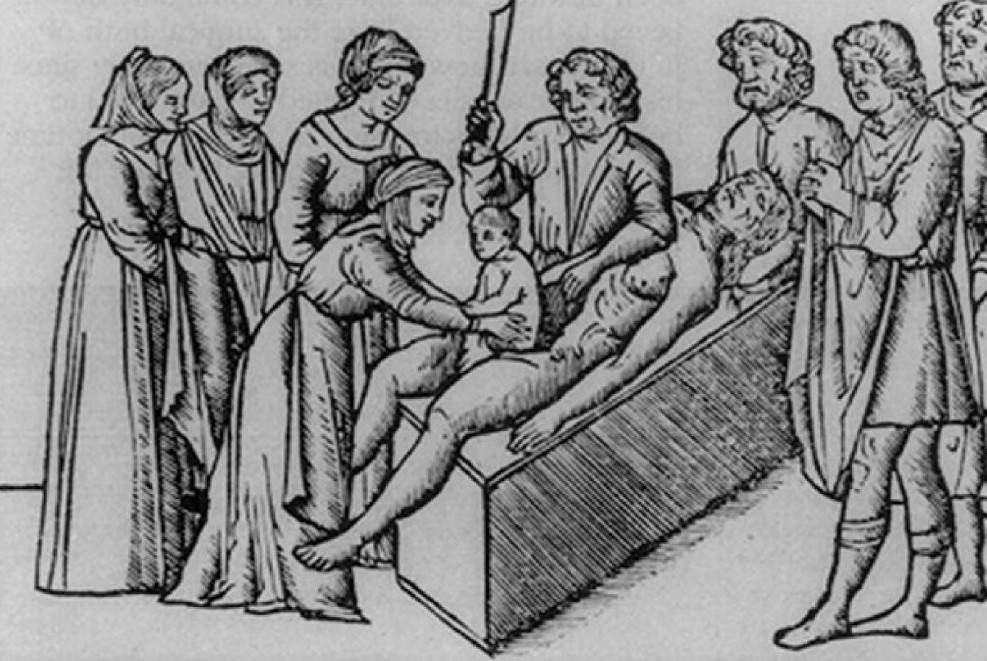
Medieval woodcut depicting the birth of Julius Caesar

==== Caesarean sections ====
During a Roman Caesarean section, the doctors would make an incision into the abdomen and uterus of the mother. Following this, the baby was removed. This practice could also be conducted on dead mothers in order to remove the babies from their corpses. It was rare for doctors to perform this operation, as it had a high mortality rate. According to Roman religion the god Asclepius was born through a Caesarian section. Roman historians Suetonius and Pliny the Elder also record Julius Caesar as being born by Caesarian section. However, the veracity of these claims is debated.

== Menstrual cycle ==
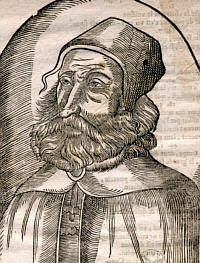
Galen of Pergamon, an ancient Roman doctor

Ancient Greek and Roman gynecologists believed that women were naturally more prone to humoral imbalance and therefore illness. For example, women were more likely to become "moist". It was believed that the female body had more water than the male body. Ancient doctors thought that puberty, specifically the menarche, could be caused through an excess of fluid buildup in the female body, and thus menstruation was the body's way of regulating its fluid and humoral balance. This idea led to Roman doctors not taking notice of problematic menstrual cycles; excessive and minimal menstruation were medical problems noticed by doctors. Pliny the Elder, a Roman naturalist, wrote that menstrual fluid could wither fruit, cause insanity in dogs, dull mirrors, rust iron and bronze, kill bees, pollute purple fabrics, cause miscarriages in horses and humans, and sour crops. He also believed that if a woman menstruated during a solar or lunar eclipse, sexual intercourse could result in death. Pliny stated that the touch of a menstruating woman could treat medical conditions such as gout, fevers, erysipelas, scrofula, skin cancer, and bites from rabid dogs. Aside from medicinal uses, Pliny listed a number of supernatural uses. For example, magi could not perform any magic feats if their doorsteps had been touched by menstrual blood. It was also believed that menstrual fluid could contaminate entrances, and therefore households.

Ancient Roman doctors such as Aetius believed that amenorrhea, or the absence of a menstrual cycle, was caused by a "hot temperament". Soranus noticed psychosomatic causes of this condition; in this scenario he advised no treatment. He also believed that this condition could be caused by a lack of a feminine body, he recommended restricting food intake to reshape the body. Cucumbers, grapes, and wine were also used to treat this condition. It could also be treated with an incision into the hymen. This therapy was also used to treat dysmenorrhea, which the Romans called "retention of the menstrual flux". It is a menstrual disorder characterized by pelvic, abdominal, or back pain resulting from menstruation. Chamomile is a type of daisy-like plant that ancient Roman woman used to treat dysmenorrhea. Venipuncture through leeches was another kind of treatment for this disorder. In ancient Rome, women with heavy menstrual bleeding would be treated by applying ligatures to the groin and to the armpits, thus blocking off blood flow throughout the body. It was theorized this also resulted in the reduction of blood flow to the uterus. Following this, blunt corks, liquid pitch, and pessaries soaked with alum, plant sap, or the yolk of roasted eggs were inserted inside the vagina. Premenstrual syndrome, a condition leading to severe abnormalities prior to menstruation, may have been noticed by Roman doctors. Roman doctors stated that menstruation occurs all at once in a specific moment each month, it is possible this theory was designed to account for the syndrome.

== Vaginal bleeding and discharge ==
Vaginal bleeding is the expulsion of blood from the vagina. Galen described a woman suffering from this condition, or what he described as the "female flux". Other names for this condition included the "abnormal flux", "menstrual flux", and "hemorrhage of the uterus". Juvenal was a Roman poet notable for his Satires. In these works, he occasionally described what we know to be vaginal discharge, which is the collection of cells, bacteria, and liquid used to protect and lubricate the vagina. He wrote about a "great torrent of sheer lust" running down a woman's legs at the idea of engaging in "energetic" interactions with a man. Juvenal also stated that "No woman will say no to her moist vulva", and he describes an adulteress coming home with a fluid on her dress, possibly semen or vaginal discharge.

== See also ==
- Medicine in ancient Rome
