= Cleopatra the Physician =

Egyptian physician and author

Cleopatra the Physician (Greek: Κλεοπάτρα, Kleopatra; fl. late 1st century CE) was a Greek medical writer and author of a manual entitled Cosmetics. Six fragments of her Cosmetics survive in quotation from later medical writers.

== Identity and date ==
Cleopatra's work is known from six fragments of her writing, probably all from Cosmetics. Four of these fragments are quoted by the 2nd–3rd century CE physician Galen, and the other two by the Byzantine physicians Aetius of Amida and Paulus of Aegina. Nothing is known about her life, but her work can be dated to the late 1st century as she refers to a weight standard which was only in use after 64 CE, and she is known to have been cited in another work entitled Cosmetics by the late 1st-century physician Crito, from which Galen took his quotations of Cleopatra's writing. Cleopatra's works were originally written in Greek, later translated into Latin. The identification with the Egyptian queen Cleopatra VII (died 30 BCE) as the author of this work, a claim suggested by some ancient writers (including Aetius), is therefore incorrect. It has, however, been argued that the later Cleopatra may have chosen this name as a pseudonym in reference to Queen Cleopatra. She should also be distinguished from Cleopatra the Alchemist. She solidified herself in medical history through her works, as they were a point of reference for later physicians and surgeons.

== Cosmetics ==
The Cosmetics (Ancient Greek: Κοσμητική, romanized: Kosmetiké, lit. 'the art of dress and ornament') are a manual offering advice and instructions for preparing remedies for issues such as dandruff and baldness, with several different cures offered for each. These cures employed a wide variety of plants, liquid products such as oil, wine, and vinegar, minerals such as lead and soda, and animal products including roasted horse teeth, marrow from a stag, and mouse droppings. These remedies came about through both holistic herbalism, and symbolic meaning, for example, horse teeth may represent strength. The surviving fragments also include a recipe for perfumed soap, instructions on curling and dyeing hair, and a list of different weight and measurement systems in use around the Mediterranean. The manual therefore seems aimed at an international audience of physicians, who might provide both medicines and cosmetic products, as both were primarily based on plant products.

== Gynaecology ==
Two works on gynaecology are also attributed to an author named Cleopatra: The Gynaecia (Ancient Greek: Γυναικεία, romanized: Gynaikeia, lit. 'women's issues'), a recipe collection of cures for gynaecological problems, and the Pessaria, a list of twenty pessaries. Both are preserved in Latin versions, though the preface of Gynaecia refers to its having been translated from Greek. It is possible that the original Greek versions of these works were also part of the Cosmetics, and that this work therefore had a broader scope than its title implies, encompassing both gynaecology and cosmetics. This work was shown to have a combination of herbal remedies along with surgical interventions for many different ailments.

== See also ==
- Women's medicine in antiquity
