= Royal College of Obstetricians and Gynaecologists =

Professional medical association

- Established: September 1929; 97 years ago
- Headquarters: Union St, London
- Location: United Kingdom
- President: [[Alison Wright]
- Website: www.rcog.org.uk

The Royal College of Obstetricians and Gynaecologists (RCOG) is a professional association based in London, United Kingdom. Its members, including people with and without medical degrees, work in the field of obstetrics and gynaecology, that is, pregnancy, childbirth, and female sexual and reproductive health. The college has over 16,000 members in over 100 countries with nearly 50% of those residing outside the British Isles. Catherine, Princess of Wales became the RCOG's patron in 2018.

The college's primary object is given as "The encouragement of the study and the advancement of the science and practice of obstetrics and gynaecology", although its governing documents impose no specific restrictions on its operation. Its present offices are based in London Bridge. Previously, the offices were located near Regent's Park in Central London.

== History ==
The British College of Obstetricians and Gynaecologists was founded in September 1929 by Professor William Blair-Bell and Sir William Fletcher Shaw; this area of surgery having been considered for many decades as "minor" when a component of England's Royal College of Surgeons. For the first three years, the office work of the new college was done from 20 St John Street, Manchester. In 1932 the office moved to 58 Queen Anne Street, London. The building was officially opened by the college's royal patron, the Duchess of York, on 5 December 1932.

The organisation was granted a royal charter on 21 March 1947. With continuing expansion of the college activities, it had outgrown the Queen Anne Street premises and a decision was made in 1952 to move to larger premises.

The college moved to 27 Sussex Place, Regent's Park, on Crown Estate land, in July 1960. The new building was formally opened by Queen Elizabeth II, on 13 July 1960. In 2018, the Duchess of Cambridge became the college's royal patron.

In 2019, the college moved to new premises: 10–18 Union St, London, SE1 1SZ.

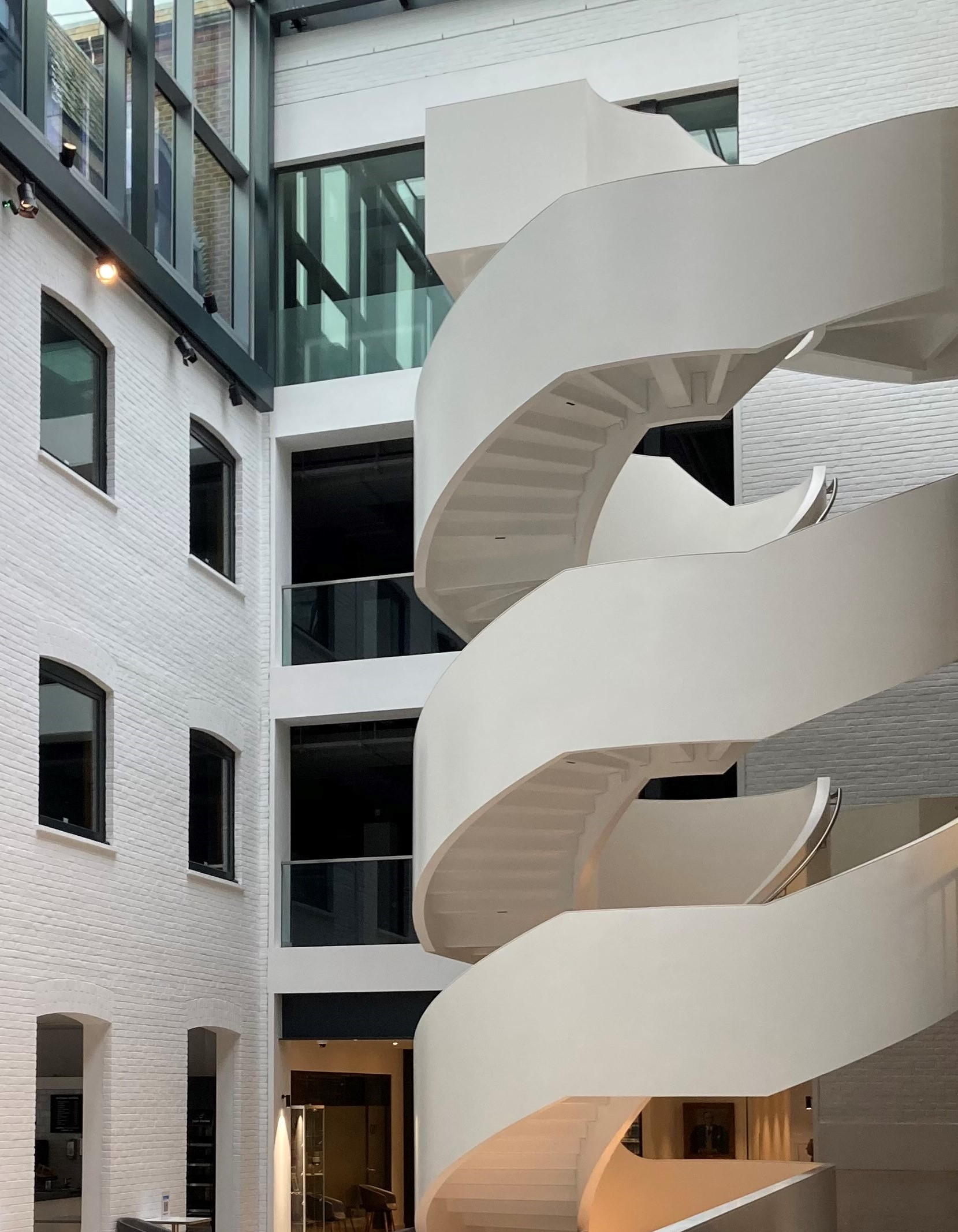
Royal College of Obstetricians and Gynaecologists headquarters in London

== Aim, objectives and values ==
The RCOG's aim is "to set standards to improve women's health and the clinical practice of obstetrics and gynaecology in the British Isles and across the world".

Their charitable objectives are to "encourage the study, and advance the science and practice, of obstetrics and gynaecology".

They value leadership, innovation, caring, inclusiveness, trust and integrity. They act with transparency and aspire to work, at all times, to the highest standards.

Strategic goals and objectives 2017–2020

The college's strategic plan for 2017–2020 aims to fulfil their twin ambitions of becoming the "go-to" place for women's health in the UK and a global leader for women's health and reproductive health care.

1. Improve women's health care by high-quality education, training and support of doctors throughout their careers
2. Improve women's lives globally through the development of safe, high-quality clinical care, throughout adolescence and the reproductive and post-reproductive years
3. Connect healthcare professionals, service users and partner organisations to radically improve women's health care both in the UK and globally
4. Achieve resilience by developing workforce and financial sustainability, business innovation and technological agility

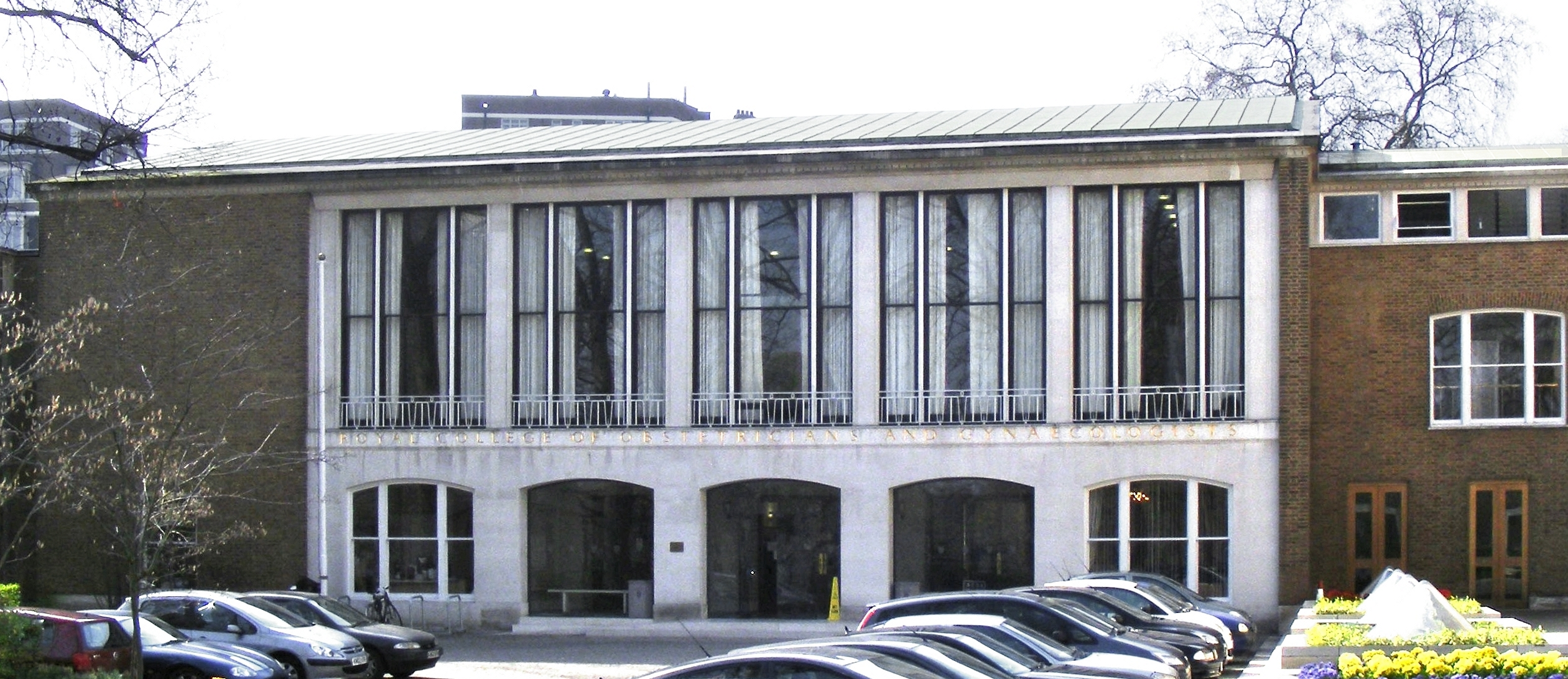
Old Royal College of Obstetricians and Gynaecologists headquarters in London

== Examinations ==
The RCOG is responsible for developing the framework and curriculum of post graduate training in obstetrics and gynaecology in the United Kingdom. It conducts two principal examinations: the Membership examination (MRCOG) and the Diploma examination (DRCOG). The DRCOG examination is aimed at doctors, and especially general practitioners, who wish to certificate their knowledge and interest in obstetrics and gynaecology. The Membership examination, which were first held in 1931, is intended for those who wish to specialise in obstetrics and gynaecology. The exam is a three-part examination. Part 1 MRCOG is a written multiple choice examination comprising 200 single best answer questions split over two papers and is intended to evaluate basic and clinical sciences relevant to the subject. Part 2 is a further written examination comprising 200 single best answer and extending matching questions split over 2 papers which is intended to assess clinical knowledge at the level of middle grade registrar, and the Part 3 is the clinical section. (OSCEs).

== Membership ==
Members use the designatory letters MRCOG. Membership is awarded at a meeting of council to those who have passed all parts of the membership examination.

The award of the fellowship is a mark of senior status and does not indicate completion of training. They are elected from those who have been members for at least 12 years. Once members doctors may use title of Mr/Miss/Mrs. Fellows use the designatory letters FRCOG. Fellowship can also be awarded to those who are not been members of the college, but have either contributed significantly to the advancement of the speciality (fellows ad eundem); demonstrated exemplary work in the speciality (fellows honoris causa) or distinguished people outside the medical profession (honorary fellows).

== Presidents ==
The current president of the RCOG is Alison Wright who took up office in December 2025.

Past presidents include:

- 2022-2025 Ranee Thakar
- 2019–2022 Edward Morris
- 2016–2019 Professor Dame Lesley Regan
- 2013–2016 Dr David Richmond
- 2010–2013 Dr Anthony Falconer
- 2007–2010 Sir Sabaratnam Arulkumaran
- 2004–2007 Professor Allan Templeton
- 2001–2004 Professor William Dunlop
- 1998–2001 Professor Robert Shaw
- 1995–1998 Lord Naren Patel
- 1993–1994 Professor Geoffrey Chamberlain (1930–2014)
- 1990–1993 Sir Stanley Simmons
- 1987–1990 Sir George Pinker (1924–2007)
- 1984–1987 Sir Malcolm MacNaughton (1925–2016)
- 1981–1984 Sir Rustam Feroze (1920–2010)
- 1978–1981 Sir Anthony Alment (1922–2002)
- 1975–1978 Sir John Dewhurst (1920–2007)
- 1972–1975 Sir Stanley Clayton (1911–1986)
- 1969–1972 Sir Norman Jeffcoate (1907–1992)
- 1966–1969 Sir John Peel (1904–2005)
- 1963–1966 Sir Hector Maclennan (1905–1978)
- 1960–1963 Sir Arthur Bell (1904–1977)
- 1957–1960 Sir Andrew Claye (1896–1977)
- 1955–1957 Sir Charles Read (1902–1957)
- 1952–1955 Sir Arthur Gemmell (1892–1960)
- 1949–1952 Dame Hilda Lloyd (1891–1982)
- 1946–1949 Sir William Gilliatt (1884–1956)
- 1943–1946 Sir Eardley Lancelot Holland (1879–1967)
- 1938–1943 Sir William Fletcher Shaw (1878–1961)
- 1935–1938 Sir Ewen Maclean (1865–1953)
- 1932–1935 John Shields Fairbairn (1865–1944)
- 1929–1932 Professor William Blair-Bell (1871–1936)

== Journals and publications ==
BJOG: An International Journal of Obstetrics and Gynaecology

BJOG is a monthly editorially independent peer reviewed journal owned by the RCOG publishing work in all areas of obstetrics and gynaecology, including contraception, urogynaecology, fertility, oncology and clinical practice. It is one of the most widely read journals in obstetrics and gynaecology. It had an impact factor of 5.051 as of March 2018. BJOG also release podcasts.

The Obstetrician & Gynaecologist

TOG is a quarterly journal for continuing professional development from the RCOG. The journal is known for its reviews and clinical governance articles.

O&G

O&G is the membership magazine of the RCOG. The magazine focuses on supporting clinicians on workforce issues including rota gaps, attrition and job planning.

== See also ==
- The Diploma of the Royal College of Gynaecologists
- Faculty of Sexual and Reproductive Healthcare
