= William Fletcher Shaw =

English obstetric physician and gynaecologist

Sir William Fletcher Shaw
- Photograph by Walter Stoneman
- Born: 13 April 1878; Manchester, England
- Died: 14 November 1961 (aged 83)
- Education: Owens College, Manchester Grammar School and University of Manchester
- Known for: Co-founding the British College of Obstetricians and Gynaecologists
- Spouses: Nora née Jones, later Mabie Mary Née Beaty
- Awards: FRCP, FRCOG, MMSA, FACS
- Scientific career
- Fields: Obstetrics and gynaecology

Sir William Fletcher Shaw (13 April 1878 – 14 November 1961) was an English obstetrics physician and gynaecologist who was most notable along with William Blair-Bell for creating the British College of Obstetricians and Gynaecologists (BCOG). He was Emeritus Professor of Obstetrics and Gynaecology at the University of Manchester.

== Life ==
Shaw was the son of David Shaw who was employed as an industrial chemist and Zilliah Shaw Née Fletcher who was the daughter of William Fletcher, who ran a firm that manufactured wool in Littleborough, Greater Manchester area. Shaw was educated at both Owens College and Manchester Grammar School before going on matriculate at the Victoria University of Manchester to study Medicine. While at university, Shaw was the president of the Students' Union and the debating society. Shaw graduated MB, ChB in 1903.

Shaw was married twice. The first time he married was on 9 December 1920 to Nora née Jones, who was from Manchester and had two sons. Nora Shaw died in 1934. Shaw's first son became a physician with the same speciality as his father, namely Obstetrics and gynaecology. His second son was a soldier killed in Normandy in 1944. Shaw to commemorate his son, in memoriam the William Meredith Fletcher Shaw lecture was created. In 1939, he married Mabie Mary Née Beaty who was also a widow. Shaw's second wife died in 1947.

== Career ==
Shaw's first clinical post as a resident was at Manchester Royal Infirmary and later at the Saint Mary's Hospital for Women and Children where he was a resident surgical officer. At Saint Mary's Shaw took part in establishing a pathology laboratory. Shaw passed his Doctor of Medicine (MD) with Gold Medal in 1906, with a thesis created from research into chronic metritis. Shaw started his career in a time when medicine and technology were undergoing rapid advancement as evidenced by the unique travelling experience he underwent at the end of his exams. To hear his results, Shaw travelled to university in a horse-drawn carriage to hear the result of his final examination one day and on the next day, he travelled by an electrically-driven tram. In 1912, Shaw was elected to the honorary staff of Saint Mary's Hospital for Women and Children. During 1919, Shaw was promoted to be honorary gynaecologist at Manchester Royal Infirmary. In 1925 Shaw was promoted to professor of obstetrics and gynaecology at the University of Manchester. In 1943 he retired and became an emeritus professor.

== Formation of the BCOG ==
On 25 October 1924 Shaw, while out rough shooting in the North Lancashire fells with Sir William Blair-Bell also a physician and gynaecologist. At a later meeting between, in a casual conversation, Shaw put the idea of founding a new college with a sub-speciality to Blair-Bell.

== Awards and honours ==
Shaw won many awards during his career. In 1936, Shaw was awarded an honorary fellowship of the American College of Surgeons. In 1939 he became a Fellow of the Royal College of Physicians. In 1947, Shaw was confirmed to the mastership of midwifery of the Society of Apothecaries honoris causa. In 1948 Shaw was awarded an honorary degree of Legum Doctor Queen's University Belfast.
