= Gynaecology =

Medical area for human female reproductive health

- System: Female reproductive system
- Subdivisions: Gynaecological oncology, maternal and foetal medicine, reproductive medicine and urogynaecology
- Significant diseases: Gynaecological cancers, infertility, dysmenorrhea, polyendocrine metabolic ovarian syndrome, endometriosis
- Significant tests: Hysteroscopy, laparoscopy, hormone levels, pap smear, HPV
- Specialist: Gynaecologist

Gynaecology (or gynecology in American English) is the area of medicine concerned with conditions affecting the female reproductive system. It is sometimes combined with the field of obstetrics, which focuses on pregnancy and childbirth, thereby forming the combined area of obstetrics and gynaecology (OB-GYN). Gynaecology encompasses preventative care, sexual health and diagnosing and treating health issues arising from the female reproduction system, such as the uterus, vagina, cervix, fallopian tubes, ovaries, and breasts; subspecialties include family planning; minimally invasive surgery; paediatric and adolescent gynaecology; and pelvic medicine.

Diagram of the female reproductive system.

Gynaecological care is discussed in the Kahun Gynaecological Papyrus and the Hippocratic Corpus, showing the ancient origins of the subject. In the 19th century, J. Marion Sims contributed to knowledge about gynaecology and developed the Sims speculum. He and others tried new surgical techniques on women. Pantaleoni completed the first hysteroscopy for an endometrial polyp in 1869 and Papanikolaou first wrote about the pap smear in 1928, and later co-wrote a book about its usefulness in diagnosing uterine cancer. Gynaecology became more regarded as a specialist area of medicine and surgery in the 20th century, and equipment such as ultrasounds have assisted the diagnosis and treatment of gynaecology conditions.

Gynaecology health problems are diagnosed in a number of ways, including medical examination, via imaging, from hormone tests and by screening. Once a diagnosis is confirmed treatment can be provided that may include medication, surgery (with less invasive procedures becoming more commonly used), or hormone based treatments. Efforts are being made globally to standardise gynaecology training for Drs, so all gynaecologists have certain competencies to help them treat patients effectively. Some patients prefer to be treated by gynaecologists of a particular sex, as they may feel uncomfortable with medical examinations conducted by men, although some countries may restrict patients ability to choose.

Transgender, intersex and nonbinary individuals can require gynaecological care. Health disparities exist within gynaecology, which can impact women in low and middle income countries, minority groups in some countries, women of particular socioeconomic groups, and the LGBTQ+ community.

== Etymology ==
The word gynaecology comes from the oblique stem (γυναικ-) of the Greek word γυνή (gyne) meaning 'woman', and -logia meaning 'study'. Literally translated, it means 'the study of women'. Its counterpart is andrology, which deals with medical issues specific to the male reproductive system.

== History ==
=== Antiquity ===
The Kahun Gynaecological Papyrus, dated to about 1800 BC, deals with gynaecological diseases, fertility, pregnancy and contraception. The text is divided into thirty-four parts, each dealing with a specific problem and containing diagnosis and treatment; no prognosis is suggested. Treatments are non-surgical, consisting of applying medicines to the affected body part or delivering medicines orally. During this time, the womb was sometimes seen as the source of problems manifesting in other body parts.

Ayurveda, an Indian traditional medical system, also provides details about concepts and techniques related to gynaecology, addressing fertility, childbirth complications, and menstrual disorders amongst other things.

The Hippocratic Corpus contains several gynaecological treatises dating to the 5th and 4th centuries BC. Aristotle is another source for medical texts from the 4th century BC. The gynaecological treatise Gynaikeia by Soranus of Ephesus (1st/2nd century AD) is extant (together with a 6th-century Latin paraphrase by Muscio, a physician of the same school). He was the chief representative of the school of physicians known as the "methodists".

=== Middle ages and renaissance period ===
During the Middle Ages, midwives dominated women's health concerns through experienced-based knowledge, traditional remedies, and herbal medicines. Midwifery was often regarded as unscientific and was challenged with the rise of gynaecology as an official medical field. The Renaissance period, 16th century, brought about a resurgence of classical scientific advancements, including the rise of medical advancements in the field of gynaecology and obstetrics. Figures like Ambroise Pare were imperative in improving obstetrics techniques during this period. Peter Chamberlen developed the forceps, an important surgical tool that transformed childbirth and lessened maternal mortality.

=== 18th, 19th and 20th centuries ===
As medical institutions continued to expand in the 18th-19th centuries, the authority of midwives was challenged by men who dominated medical professions. The formalization of midwifery training by male doctors and advancements in medical knowledge of women's health and anatomy occurred during this period. Figures such as William Smellie, William Hunter, Paul Zweifel, Franz Karl Naegele, and Carl Crede contributed to the understanding of childbirth and women's health in Europe.

In the early 18th and 19th centuries, in the United States, the field of gynaecology, as with most medical specialities, had ties to black women and therefore slavery. Brothers Henry and Robert Campbell were editors of the first medical journal in the deep south. Henry worked as gynaecologist including on enslaved women, whilst publishing medical case narratives of operations in the journal the brothers edited. Others, such as Dr. Mary Putnam Jacobi, challenged the exclusion of women from medical education and shifted gynaecology to a scientific practice.

J. Marion Sims is regarded as the father of modern gynaecology. Some of his published medical contributions included the development of the Sims' position (1845), the Sims' speculum (1845), the Sims' sigmoid catheter, and gynaecological surgery. He was the first to develop surgical techniques for the repair of vesico-vaginal fistulas (1849), a consequence of protracted childbirth which at the time was without treatment. He founded the first women's hospital in the country in Alabama 1855 and subsequently the Woman's Hospital of New York in 1857. He was elected president of the American Medical Association in 1876. Sims conducted experimental operations on black enslaved women, without anaesthesia. Historically, white women were also subjected to experimental medical procedures.

In terms of common procedures within gynaecology, the first hysteroscopy was completed in 1869 by Pantaleoni, to treat an endometrial polyp, using a cystoscope.

Obstetrics and gynaecology were recognized as specialties in the mid-19th century, in the United Kingdom. Specialist societies came into being but it became clear that to become disciplines in their own right, a separate college was required. William Fletcher Shaw (Professor of Midwifery at Manchester University) and William Blair-Bell (Professor of Obstetrics at Liverpool University) worked to establish The British College of Obstetricians and Gynaecologists in 1929, this later became the Royal College of Obstetricians and Gynaecologists.

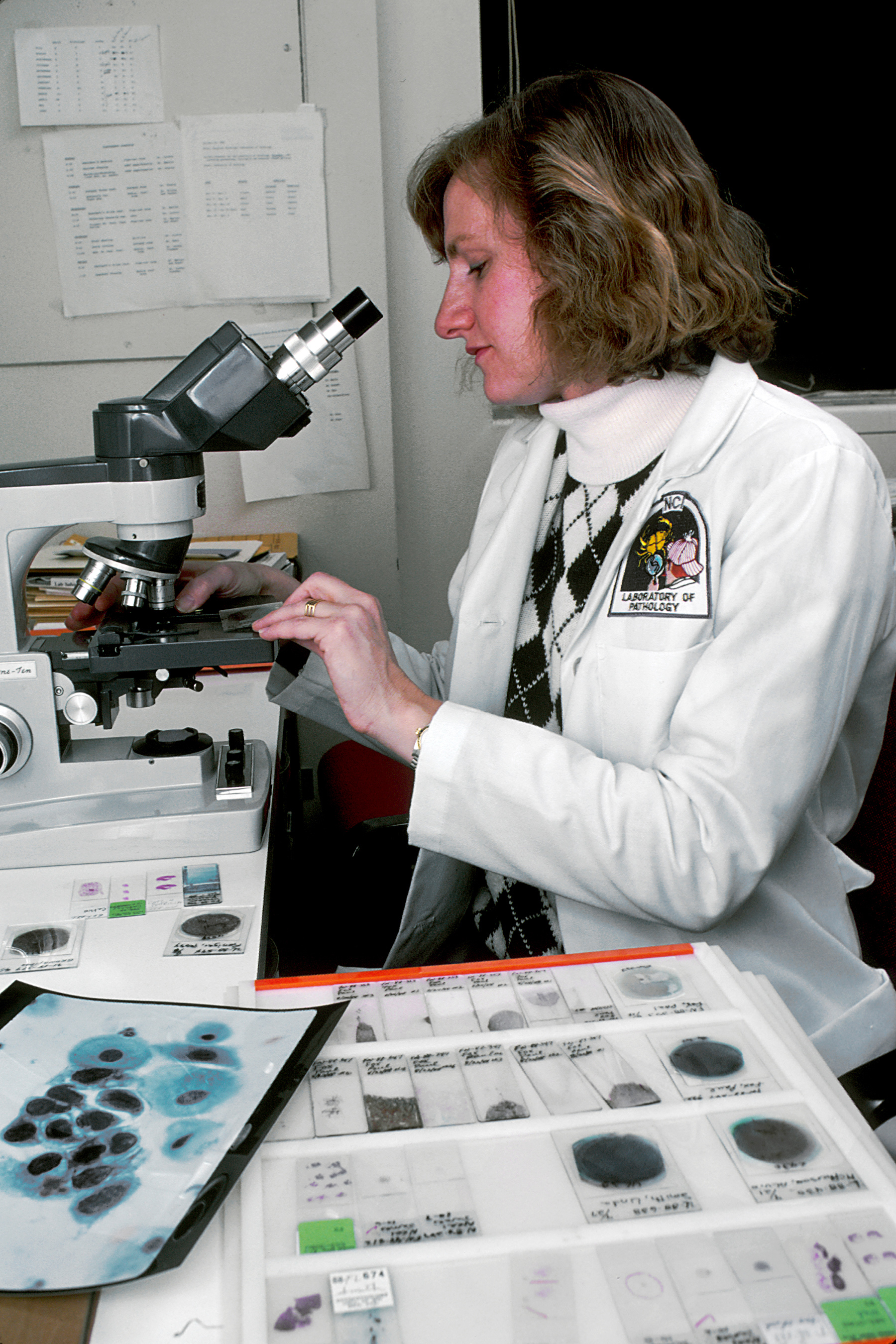
Pap smear being examined under a microscope in 1988. Image courtesy of National Cancer Institute.

Georgios Papanikaou, from Greece, is credited with discovering the pap smear test, he identified differences in the cytology of normal and malignant cervical cells by viewing swabs smeared on microscopic slides. His first publication of the finding in 1928 was not widely received. He later collaborated with Dr Herbert Traut at an American hospital and they published a book, Diagnosis of Uterine Cancer by the Vaginal Smear and this medical advancement became more widely known about.

By the 20th century, the American College of Obstetricians and Gynecologists (1951) was founded. There were advances in antiseptic techniques, anaesthesia, and diagnostic tools, which transformed gynaecological care.

Minority groups in the United States experienced forced sterilizations and eugenic policies. Between 1909 and 1979, an estimated 20,000 forced sterilizations occurred in California, primarily in mental institutions and prisons. Healthcare later became more focused on the importance of informed consent.

In Canada during the 1940s, practitioners focused on obstetrics and gynaecology began identifying the need for a separate organization to deal with this specialism and the idea to form the Society of Obstetricians and Gynaecologists of Canada (SOGC) was conceived. The Royal College of Physicians and Surgeons formally recognized obstetrics & gynaecology in 1957.

Ian Donald, a gynaecologist from the United Kingdom was an early pioneer of the use of sonography within gynaecology and obstetrics. He gained knowledge of radar technology in the air force and working with an engineer called Tom Brown and an engineering company, they developed a compact 2D ultrasound machine. In 1958, he published a paper in the Lancet.

Newer techniques for hysterectomies have evolved over time, with the first laparoscopic hysterectomy completed by Harry Reich in Pennsylvania, in January 1988.

==== Birth control trials ====
Margaret Sanger worked to make contraception legal and available. In 1951 she met Gregory Pincus and in a project that was financially sponsored by Katharine McCormick, they developed the contraceptive pill. In 1954, due to anti-birth control laws, the first trials in Massachusetts were positioned as being fertility trials. Gregory Pincus and John Rock conducted these trials. Oral progesterone was tested on fertility patients, with consent, however the oral contraceptive was also tested on 28 psychiatric patients at Worcester State Hospital, without the patients consent. They discovered that women stopped ovulating and that this occurred only whilst taking this. To get FDA approval, a larger clinical trial was needed.

Larger clinical trials took place in Puerto Rico, a territory of the United States. Puerto Rico had no anti-birth control laws and already had services offering birth control. Trials began in Rio Piedras in 1956, and women were offered the pill, called Envoid in 1960, on the basis it prevented pregnancy, without knowing it did not have FDA approval. Three women died in the trial and criticisms include that side effects were not taken seriously. Dr. Edris Rice-Wray, a professor at the Puerto Rico Medical School raised concerns about the negative side effects of the pill.

== Diagnosis ==
In some countries or within some healthcare systems, women must first see a general practitioner or family practitioner before seeing a gynaecologist. If the condition cannot be diagnosed or treated and requires a specialist the patient is referred to a gynaecologist. In other countries, patients can see a gynaecologist without a referral.

Gynecologists give reproductive and sexual health services that include pelvic exams, Pap tests, cancer screenings, treatment for hormone imbalance, and testing and treatment for vaginal infections. They diagnose and treat reproductive system disorders such as endometriosis, infertility, ovarian cysts, and pelvic pain. They may also care for people with ovarian, cervical, and other reproductive cancers.

As with all of medicine, the main tools of diagnosis are clinical history, examination and investigations. Gynaecological examination is quite intimate, more so than a routine physical exam. It can also require instruments such as the speculum which is used to retract the tissues of the vagina to allow examination of the cervix, the lower part of the uterus located within the upper portion of the vagina. Gynaecologists may do a bimanual examination (one hand on the abdomen and one or two fingers in the vagina) to palpate the cervix, uterus, ovaries and pelvis.

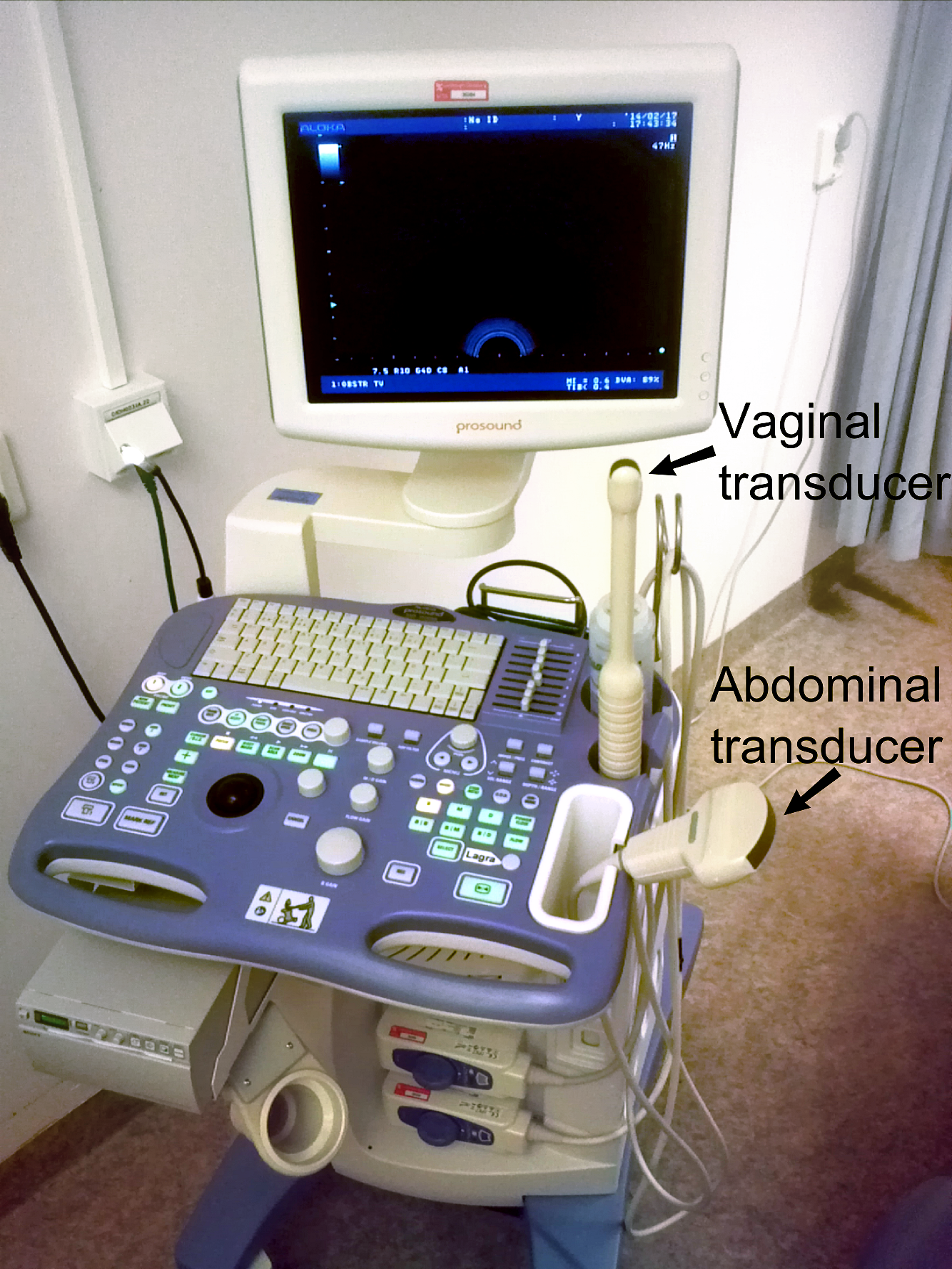
Diagnostic transvaginal ultrasound machine. Image by Mikael Häggström, used with permission.

An abdominal or vaginal ultrasound can be used for diagnostic purposes. This can help to detect growths, such as polyps, endometrial hyperplasia, carcinoma, endometriosis, pelvic inflammatory disease, polyendocrine metabolic ovarian syndrome (PMOS) and many other gynaecology conditions. This is a very common diagnostic technique.

Hormone tests can be useful when investigating gynaecology based conditions or symptoms. These may check the hormone levels of oestradiol, progesterone, follicle stimulating hormone and luteinizing hormones, for example. Levels considered not normal, could indicate the presence of conditions and could impact reproductive function.

== Conditions and diseases ==
Examples of conditions dealt with by a gynaecologist are:

- Cancer and pre-cancerous diseases of the reproductive organs including ovaries, uterus, cervix, vagina, and vulva
- Incontinence of urine
- Amenorrhoea (absence of menstrual periods)
- Abnormal uterine growths such as fibroids and polyps
- Endometriosis
- Dysmenorrhoea (painful menstrual periods)
- Infertility
- Menorrhagia (heavy menstrual periods); a common indication for hysterectomy when other treatments have failed
- Prolapse of pelvic organs
- Infections of the vagina (vaginitis), cervix and uterus (including fungal, bacterial, viral, and protozoal)
- Pelvic inflammatory disease
- Urinary tract infections
- Polyendocrine metabolic ovarian syndrome (PMOS)
- Premenstrual dysphoric disorder
- Atrophic vaginitis
- Post-menopausal osteoporosis
- Premenstrual Syndrome
- Other vaginal diseases

Some of these conditions are dealt with by doctors with specialisms other than, or in addition to, gynaecology. For example, a woman with urinary incontinence may be referred to a doctor with urology specialist experience and someone with cancer may be treated by a multidisciplinary team with specialist oncology experience.

== Treatments ==
=== Surgeries ===
Gynaecologists may use medical and/or surgical treatments, depending on the medical condition they are treating. Pre- and post-operative medical management often utilises drug therapies, such as antibiotics, diuretics, antihypertensives, and antiemetics. Additionally, gynaecologists make frequent use of specialized hormone-modulating therapies (such as Clomifene citrate and hormonal contraception) to treat disorders of the female genital tract that are responsive to pituitary or gonadal signals.

Surgery can be used to treat gynaecology conditions. In the past, gynaecologists were not considered "surgeons", although this is the source of controversy. Modern advancements in general surgery and gynaecology, mean there is now less of a distinction. The rise of sub-specialties within gynaecology which are primarily surgical in nature (for example urogynaecology and gynaecological oncology) have strengthened the reputations of gynaecologists as surgical practitioners. Gynaecologists are now eligible for fellowship in both the American College of Surgeons and Royal Colleges of Surgeons, and many newer surgical textbooks include chapters on (at least basic) gynaecological surgery.

Some of the more common operations that gynaecologists perform include:

1. Dilation and curettage (removal of the uterine contents for various reasons, including completing a partial miscarriage and diagnostic sampling for dysfunctional uterine bleeding refractive to medical therapy).
2. Polypectomy (removal of polyps).
3. Hysterectomy (removal of the uterus).
4. Oophorectomy (removal of the ovaries).
5. Myomectomy (removal of fibroids).
6. Endometrial ablation (destroys layer of the endometrium to reduce bleeding).
7. Tubal ligation (a type of permanent sterilization).
8. Hysteroscopy (inspection of the uterine cavity) – Hysteroscopy can be used to minimally invasive remove uterine fibroids, and in some cases a diode laser may be employed for precise excision. This approach minimizes tissue damage and bleeding, reduces the risk of adhesions, and may be suitable for patients wishing to preserve fertility.
9. Laparoscopy – minimally invasive surgery used to diagnose or treat a variety of conditions. It can be used to treat uterine fibroids and accurately diagnose and treat pelvic/abdominal endometriosis. Endometriotic lesions may be excised or ablated using heat, including laser, preserving surrounding tissue and anatomy, reducing scars and adhesions, and supporting fertility.
10. Laparotomy – may be used to investigate the level of progression of benign or malignant disease, or to assess and repair damage to the pelvic organs.
11. Various surgical treatments for urinary incontinence and pelvic prolapse, including mid-urethral mesh sling procedures.
12. Appendectomy – often performed to remove site of painful endometriosis implantation or prophylactically (against future acute appendicitis) at the time of hysterectomy or Caesarean section. May also be performed as part of a staging operation for ovarian cancer.
13. Cervical Excision Procedures (including cryosurgery) – removal of the surface of the cervix containing pre-cancerous cells which have been previously identified on Pap smear.
14. Non-invasive as well as non-hormonal laser treatment for atrophic vaginitis.

=== Non-surgical treatments ===
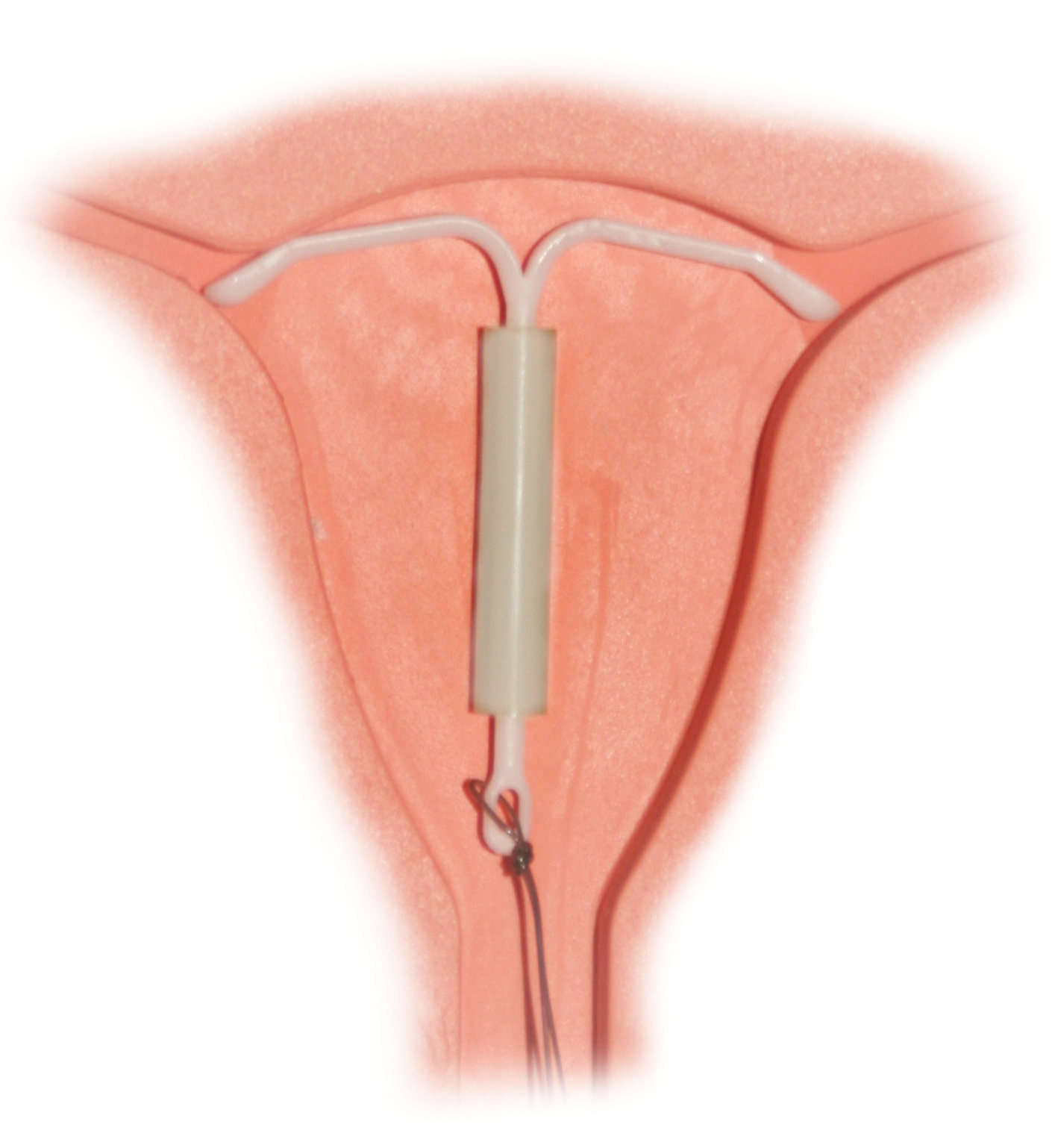
Mirena Coil (2008)

Tranexamic acid has been found to be an effective drug to reduce the amount of bleeding during menstruation and medical procedures, so can be used to treat menorrhagia. Hormone based IUDs, such as Mirena have also been shown to help reduce heavy periods.

There are an increasing number of non-surgical treatments available to help uterine fibroids, along with tranexamic acid and progesterone releasing IUSs, such as contraceptive steroid hormones, gonadotropin releasing hormone (GnRH) agonists and antagonists with and without additional hormones, and selective progesterone receptor modulator (SPRM). Organizations such as the American College of Obstetricians and Gynecologists (ACOG) advocate such treatments before surgical intervention, but studies reveal many women who had a hysterectomy between 2011 and 2019 did not receive any other treatments before this.

Hormonal therapy can be used as a non-surgical treatment for endometriosis. Research shows gonadotropin-releasing hormone (GnRH) antagonists, like elagolix, can give encouraging results in managing some symptoms. Also encouraging is research on aromatase inhibitors, such as letrozole that has shown efficacy in reducing lesion size and pain severity.

=== Transgender and sex reassignment ===
Some transgender women prefer to see gynaecologists for relevant routine health checks. Transgender men may also seek care from gynaecologists as they may not have undertook sex reassignment and still require routine health checks. Gynaecologists often play an important role in the surgical team that helps female to male transsexuals.

=== Recent discoveries ===
Newer advancements in gynaecology include the integration of artificial intelligence (AI) in clinical practice, specifically with diagnostics and predictive analytics. AI algorithms are able to interpret complex gynaecological imaging and pathology data, which improves diagnostic accuracy. These technologies are especially used in identifying cervical and ovarian cancers and predicting treatment outcomes.

Liquid biopsy is emerging as an important noninvasive tool to detect and monitor gynaecology cancers. Tumour-derived biomarkers, such as circulating tumour DNA (ctDNA), circulating tumour cells (CTCs), exosomes and microRNA, can provide insights into the biological behaviour of gynaecology cancers. Some believe this could revolutionize cancer treatment, assisting with earlier detection and predicting disease recurrence.

In terms of surgery, research has led to minimally invasive approaches, such as vaginal natural orifice transluminal endoscopic surgery. This technique allows surgeons to access the pelvic cavity through the vaginal canal, reducing recovery times, postoperative pain, and complication rates in comparison to traditional methods.

== Qualifications ==
Globally, there have been efforts to decrease variations in gynaecology curriculums, at undergraduate and postgraduate levels, between different countries and universities. An example of this is FIGO's international recommendations of the core competencies required to become a gynaecologist. Some postgraduate/residency training has moved from being duration based, to being competency based. At undergraduate and postgraduate levels, simulations (such as virtual reality laparoscopic simulators) form an important part of training, so skills can be developed before (and whilst) training working with patients. Postgraduate training globally differs by length of training, cases studied and by oversight. Due to advancements in treatments, qualified gynaecologists must continuously obtain new skills and knowledge. In some jurisdictions it is a requirement for gynaecologists to gain continuing medical education credits (annually or biannually).

In the United States, obstetrics and gynaecology typically requires residency training for four years. This encompasses comprehensive clinical and surgical education. OBGYN residents participate in a yearly in-training exam that is administered by the Council on Resident Education in Obstetrics and Gynecology (CREOG). Research suggests that combining curriculum and focused mentorship can improve residents' performance on the exam and overall educational outcomes.

In the United Kingdom, the Royal College of Obstetricians and Gynaecologists, based in London, encourages the study and advancement of both the science and practice of obstetrics and gynaecology. This is done through postgraduate medical education and training development, and the publication of clinical guidelines and reports on aspects of the specialty and service provision. The RCOG International Office works with other international organizations to help lower maternal morbidity and mortality in under-resourced countries.

Gynaecologic oncology is a subspecialty of gynaecology, dealing with gynaecology-related cancer. To become a gynaecology oncologist requires specialist further training. Urogynaecology is also a subspecialty of gynaecology and urology. Further fellowship training is needed to become a urogynaecologist. It is recommended that all gynaecologists study gynaecologic oncology and urogynaecology, to develop core competencies relevant to these fields.

== Gender of physicians ==
Improved access to education has seen women gynaecologists outnumber men in the once male-dominated medical field of gynaecology. In some gynaecological sub-specialties, where an over-representation of males persists, income discrepancies appear to show male practitioners earning higher averages.

Speculations on the decreased numbers of male gynaecologist practitioners report a perceived lack of respect from within the medical profession, limited future employment opportunities and questions to the motivations and character of men who choose the medical field concerned with female sexual organs.

Surveys of women's views on the issue of male doctors conducting intimate examinations show a large and consistent majority found it uncomfortable, were more likely to be embarrassed and less likely to talk openly or in detail about personal information, or discuss their sexual history with a man. The findings raised questions about the ability of male gynaecologists to offer quality care to patients. This, when coupled with more women choosing female physicians has decreased the employment opportunities for men choosing to become gynaecologists.

According to one source, "there is a sharp decline in the number of men opting for OB/GYN residency programs and general OB/GYN programs due to the sexist market trends. Female OB/GYN physicians are preferred over males by certain employers due to preference given to the female physicians by health care seekers."

In the United States, it has been reported that four in five students choosing a residency in gynaecology are now female. In several places in Sweden, to comply with discrimination laws, patients may not choose a doctor—regardless of specialty—based on factors such as gender and declining to see a doctor because of their gender may legally be viewed as refusing care. In Turkey, due to patient preference to be seen by another female, there are now few male gynaecologists working in the field. Some medical professionals have expressed concerns about men being excluded from the profession and suggest that gender diversity within gynaecology could be helpful to advance the speciality.

There have been a number of legal challenges in the US against healthcare providers who have started hiring based on the gender of physicians. Mircea Veleanu argued, in part, that his former employers discriminated against him by accommodating the wishes of female patients who had requested female doctors for intimate exams. A male nurse complained about an advert for an all-female obstetrics and gynaecology practice in Columbia, Maryland, claiming this was a form of sexual discrimination. In 2000, David Garfinkel, a New Jersey-based OB-GYN, sued his former employer after being fired due to, as he claimed, "because I was male, I wasn't drawing as many patients as they'd expected".

== Health disparities in gynaecology ==
Subsequent to research, some organizations such as the Royal College of Obstetricians and Gynaecologists have called on global governments and international health bodies to address the impact of benign gynaecology conditions in low and middle income countries. They found the years lost to disability from these conditions was greater than combined morbidity from malaria, TB and HIV/AIDS, accounting for 8% of all years lost to disability, for women aged 15–49. They argue that such conditions are neglected within the global health arena and have a significant impact on women in low and middle income countries.

Some benign and common gynaecology conditions have been found to disproportionately impact women of certain racial and ethnic groups. One study found that black women are three times more likely than white women, to have uterine fibroids, a variety of studies found that they are more likely to get these at a younger age and are also more likely to have numerous and rapid growing fibroids. This may be due to biological, lifestyle, environmental and clinical factors, further research is needed to understand why this disparity exists. In regards to endometriosis, some research suggests this disproportionately impacts asian women, with black and hispanic women less likely to have this condition. Research about this is somewhat inconsistent suggesting further studies would be beneficial.

In the United States, health disparities persist in gynaecology, disproportionately affecting women of colour, low-income women, and those living in rural areas. Black women face higher rates of mortality from some gynaecology based cancers. The reasons for these disparities is complex and involves racial, economic, educational and geographic factors that influence treatment and survival. Importantly, a variation from evidenced-based treatment has been indicated as a modifiable factor that can impact survival outcomes. This problem disproportionately impacts black women and poorer women. These disparities are compounded by barriers such as a lack of insurance and best practice not being followed, particularly when funded by Medicaid.

Some research in the United States shows that hispanic women had a more favourable prognosis compared to non-hispanic women, in regards to certain gynaecology based cancers. With ovarian cancer black women tended to present with more advanced ovarian cancer compared to white women, so were diagnosed at a later stage. The incidence rates of endometrial and ovarian cancer was highest in white women and the incidence of cervical cancer was highest in black women. Research showed that black and hispanic women were less likely to complete the full number of HPV vaccinations, the cause of some gynaecology based cancers. Marginalized groups are less likely to have their pain and symptoms taken seriously by providers, leading to delayed diagnoses and worse outcomes. Addressing these disparities requires physicians practicing cultural humility and addressing their own possible bias.

Research from the United States shows that disabled women are screened less for cervical cancer, are less likely to have pelvic examinations and are also less likely to access family planning services. Health service usage and whether or not they have insurance did not explain differences in screening levels. Research showed that they were less likely to receive recommendations from doctors. Women with disabilities also have a greater chance of dying from cervical cancer in counties such as South Korea and Sweden.

In the United Kingdom, in regards to ovarian cancer, socioeconomic factors appear to create a disparity in treatment and outcomes. Delays and treatment inequalities may contribute to worse outcomes for women from more deprived areas, with them less likely to receive surgery or chemotherapy. How wealthy a woman is, directly impacted mortality rates. Cervical screening attendance, which helps to diagnose cervical cancer at an early stage has declined, particularly among minority ethnic groups and in more deprived areas. Medical bias in doctor and patient interactions can cause delays to diagnosis and can stem from subconscious stereotypes, in relation to ethnicity or socioeconomic status.

The LGBTQ+ community also face health disparities within gynaecology care. Nearly one in five lesbian and bisexual women have never attended a cervical screening. Transsexual men and non binary people with a cervix are also less likely to access cervical screening. Research has shown that 22.8% of transgender people avoid accessing healthcare due to anticipated discrimination. Gynaecologists play an important role in caring for transgender patients, who face barriers within health care, as a result of marginalization and discrimination.

Indigenous women in Australia are more likely to die from gynaecology cancers. Research suggests that strategies to reduce survival disparities should target earlier diagnosis and treatment, as aboriginal women were more likely to present with more advanced cancer at the point of diagnosis and decline treatment. Research in Australia examined the issue of pelvic floor dysfunction in aboriginal women, in New South Wales. This showed a high burden of disease and that there was a reluctance of these women to seek care, due to fear of judgement and embarrassment. The authors concluded that culturally appropriate and tailored care was needed to tackle this.

== See also ==
- Obstetrics and gynaecology
- Howard Atwood Kelly
- Childbirth and obstetrics in antiquity
- Genital schistosomiasis
- Hydatidiform mole
- Gynography
- List of bacterial vaginosis microbiota
- Paediatric gynaecology

== Sources ==
- The Female Reproductive System – Encyclopædia Britannica
- Rowland, Beryl, ed. (1981). Medieval Woman's Guide to Health: The First English Gynecological Handbook. Kent, OH: Kent State University Press. ISBN 978-0-87338-243-4.
