= Metrodora =

Ancient Greek female physician and author

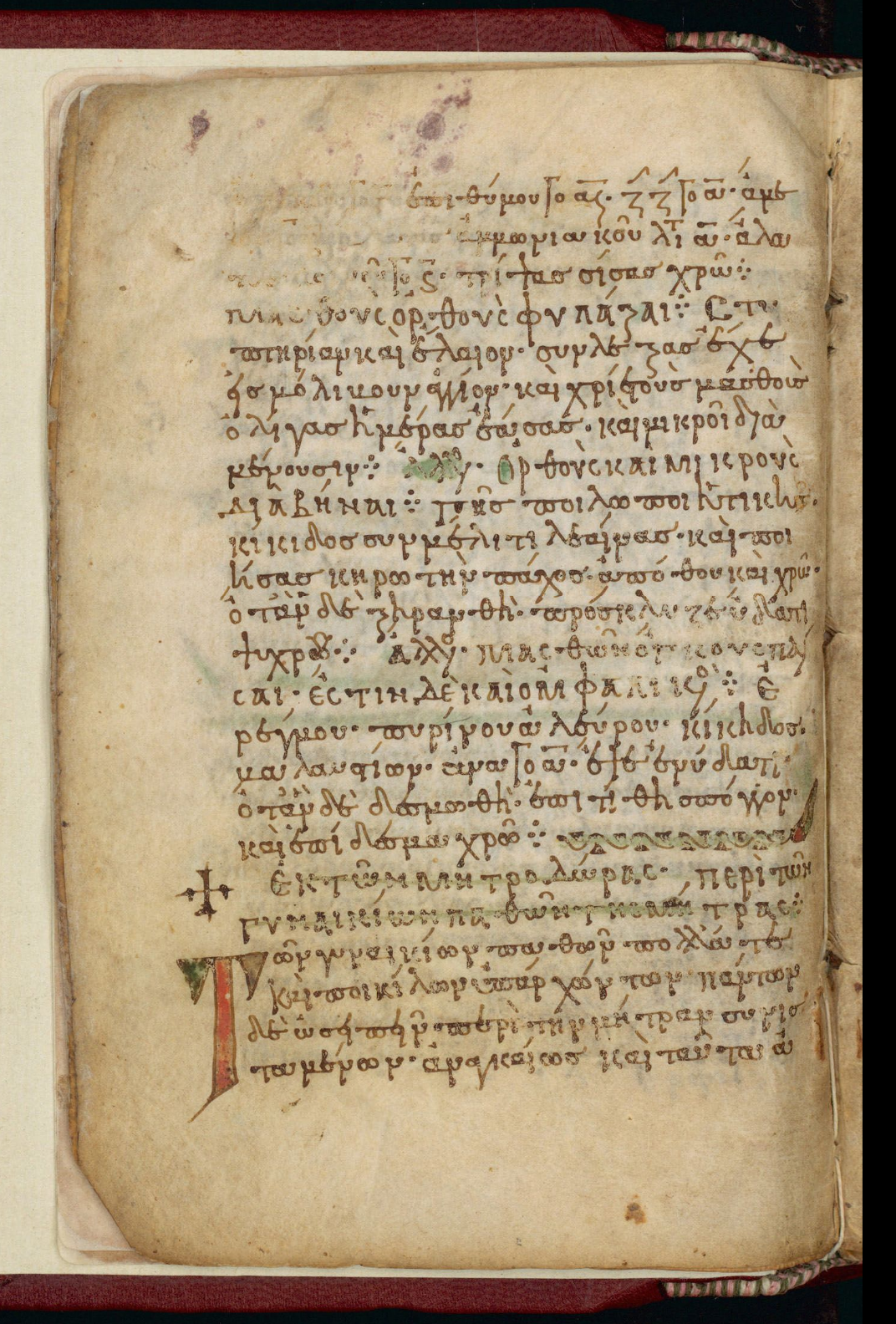
The Laurentian manuscript on which Metrodora's work is preserved. The beginning of the Metrodora text is after the cross in the left-hand margin.

Metrodora (Ancient Greek: Μητροδώρα, romanized: Mētrodōra) was possibly the author of an ancient Greek medical text, On the Diseases and Cures of Women (Περὶ τῶν Γυναικείων παθῶν τῆς μἠτρας). She is known from a single Byzantine manuscript. The manuscript, in the collection of the Laurentian Library in Florence, is a collection of writings on medical topics; the first part, attributed to Metrodora, focuses on obstetrics and women's medicine.

If Metrodora existed, she would be one of only two ancient women (along with Cleopatra the Physician) to have a surviving medical text attributed to her. Her dates are disputed: scholars' suggestions range from the first to the sixth century AD, and the latest possible date is the composition of the Laurentian manuscript in the tenth or eleventh century. Her name is also disputed; some scholars have suggested that Metrodora was a pseudonym or even the misinterpretation of the title of her work.

== On the Diseases and Cures of Women ==
On the Diseases and Cures of Women is a medical text preserved as part of a miscellany on a single manuscript, codex 75.3 from the Laurentian Library. The manuscript dates to the late tenth or early eleventh century, is authored by three different hands, and was probably compiled in southern Italy. The codex measures 110 x 170 mm, and comprises 263 leaves. There are between 25 and 27 lines of text on each page.

The text was first published by Aristotle Kousis in 1945. The surviving manuscript collects various writings on medical topics. It begins with a section focusing on obstetrics and diseases of the uterus, followed by a more general discussion of women's medicine, a collection of miscellaneous excerpts from medical writers, and finally a series of excerpts from the sixth-century physician Alexander of Tralles. The first section of the manuscript seems to be a single group of medical recipes which are unrelated to any other known medical works. Marie-Hélène Congourdeau identifies both the initial section on the womb, and the more general subsequent section on women's medicine, as being by Metrodora; on the other hand Gemma Storti suggests that the text on women's medicine generally should be grouped with the miscellaneous extracts from other medical writers, and that Metrodora might have been the author of only the initial section.

The text begins with a discussion of the womb, how it is the source of most women's diseases, and a discussion of hysteria. This discussion is heavily influenced by the treatise On the Diseases of Women in the Hippocratic Corpus. The text then discusses general diseases of the womb, conception and contraception, and childbirth. It also includes discussions of aphrodisiacs and love-potions, diseases of the breasts, and cosmetics.

At some point the Greek text of On the Diseases and Cures of Women was translated into Latin, and it was misattributed to Cleopatra. This was apparently due to a note included with one of the text's recipes, saying that it was used by Cleopatra. This Latin translation was published in 1566 by Caspar Wolf, but all manuscripts have been lost.

== Identity of Metrodora ==
The identity of Metrodora, if she existed, is unknown. Storti identifies three possibilities:

- Metrodora was a medical author whose excerpts were included in the Laurentian manuscript.
- Metrodora was both the author of the first portion of the manuscript, and the anthologist who compiled the collection of extracts which makes up the remainder of the text.
- Metrodora (meaning "gift of the uterus") was the title of a work misinterpreted as a name.

Along with Cleopatra the Physician, Metrodora is one of only two ancient women to have a surviving medical text attributed to her. Assuming that she existed, her date can only be identified as no later than the compilation of the Laurentian manuscript in the late-tenth or early-eleventh century. Scholars have argued for dates from the first to sixth centuries AD, with the sixth century being the most common.

Kousis and Giorgiou del Guerra both date Metrodora to the sixth century, on the basis of the extracts from Alexander of Tralles at the end of the Laurentian manuscript. However, Congourdeau argues in the introduction to her French translation of the Laurentian manuscript that it is a compilation, that only the first section is by Metrodora, and therefore the date of Alexander of Tralles does not help date Metrodora. Other authors have suggested earlier dates: Ian M. Plant puts Metrodora in the second century AD, and Holt Parker dates her to between the first and fifth centuries. Irene Calà and Giulia Maria Chesi argue that Metrodora was active in the earlier part of this period, and suggest that she worked in Alexandria.

Metrodora's name has frequently been cited as a reason for scepticism about her existence. Starting with Kousis' initial publication, many scholars have suggested that it derives from the Greek word metra (μήτρα), meaning "womb". Parker disputes this, calling such an etymology "impossible", and Flemming says that the name, the feminine form of the common male name Metrodorus, is well-attested. Calà and Chesi identify a 14th-century manuscript from the Vatican Library, Vat. Gr. 299, which contains two recipes attributed to Metrodora; they argue that this supports that Metrodora was the name of the author.

== Legacy ==
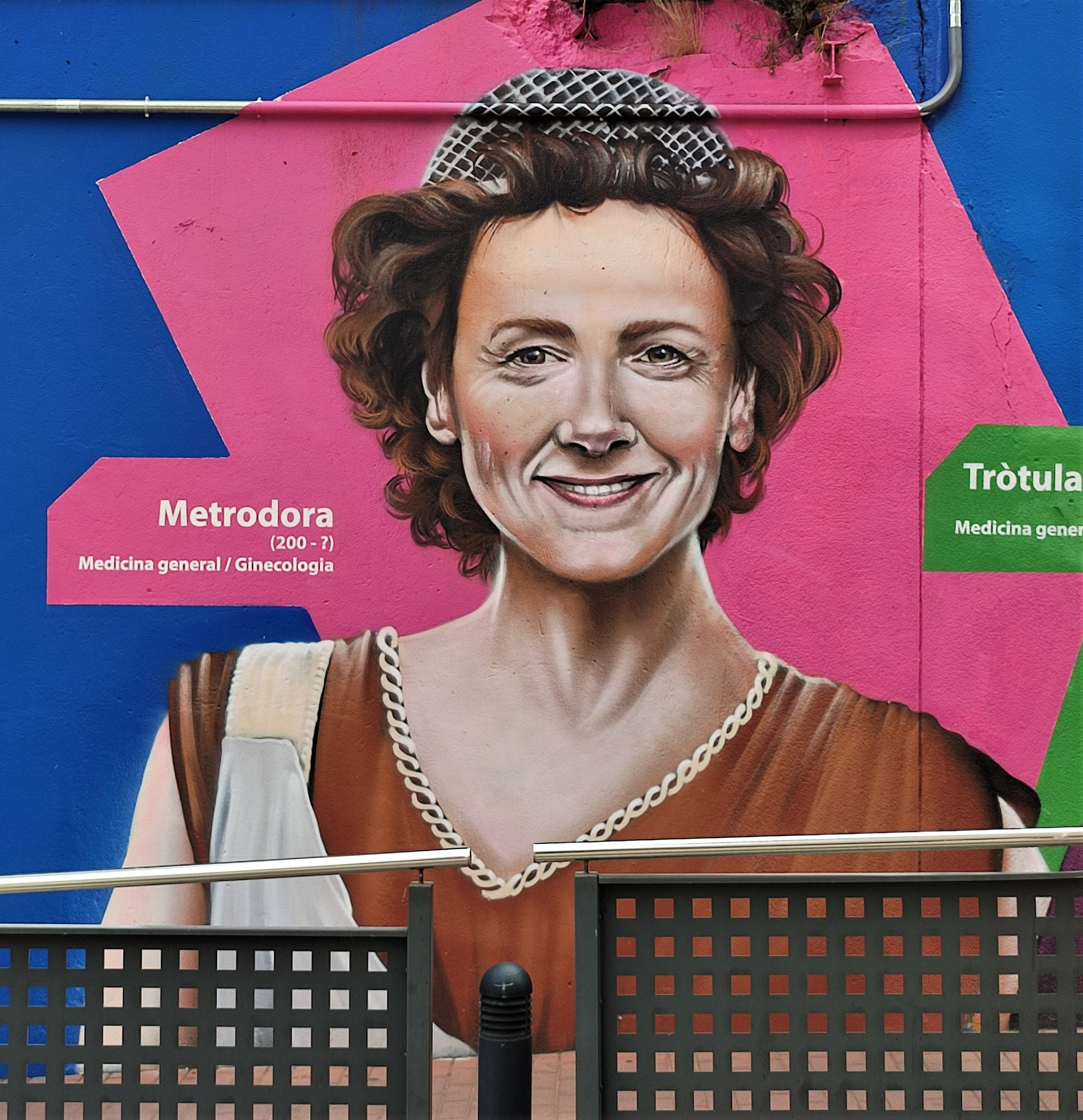
Metrodora on the Pioneers mural in Barcelona

Metrodora was included in Judy Chicago's Heritage Floor, associated with the place-setting for Hypatia in The Dinner Party. A mural outside the Vall d'Hebron University Hospital in Barcelona which depicts women scientists from history includes Metrodora. The Metrodora Institute, a women's health clinic, and Metrodora Ventures, a venture capital fund founded by Chelsea Clinton which invests in health- and education-related businesses, are both named for Metrodora.

== Works cited ==
- Calà, Irene; Chesi, Giulia Maria (2022). "Alcune considerazioni sul trattato attribuito a Metrodora: le ricette cosmetiche" (PDF). EuGeStA (in Italian). 12.
- Congourdeau, Marie-Hélène (1993). "Mètrodora et son oeuvre". In Patlagean, E. (ed.). Maladie et société à Byzance (in French).
- Flemming, Rebecca (2007). "Women, Writing, and Medicine in the Classical World". The Classical Quarterly. 57 (1): 257–279. doi:10.1017/S0009838807000225. JSTOR 4493489.
- Parker, Holt (1997). "Women Doctors in Greece, Rome, and the Byzantine Empire". In Furst, L. R. (ed.). Women Healers and Physicians: Climbing a Long Hill.
- Parker, Holt (2012). "Galen and the Girls: Sources for Women Medical Writers Revisited". Classical Quarterly. 62 (1): 359–386. doi:10.1017/S0009838811000619.
- Plant, I. M. (2004). Women Writers of Ancient Greece and Rome: an Anthology. Norman: University of Oklahoma Press. ISBN 9780806136226.
- Storti, Gemma (2018). "Metrodora's Work on the Diseases of Women and their Cures". Estudios Bizantinos. 6 (2018.6). doi:10.1344/EBizantinos2018.6.3.
- Totelin, Laurence (2017). "From technẽ to kakotechnia: The Use and Abuse of Ancient Cosmetic Texts". In Formisano, Marco; van der Eijk, Philip (eds.). Knowledge, Text and Practice in Ancient Technical Writing. Cambridge University Press.
- Totelin, Laurence (2017b). "The Third Way: Galen, Pseudo-Galen, Metrodora, Cleopatra and the Gynaecological Pharmacology of Byzantium". In Lehmhaus, Lennart; Martelli, Matteo (eds.). Collecting Recipes: Byzantine and Jewish Pharmacology in Dialogue. Berlin: de Gruyter. ISBN 978-1-5015-0255-2.
- Touwaide, Alain (2006). "Metrodora". Brill's New Pauly. doi:10.1163/1574-9347_bnp_e803280.
- Valiakos, Elias (2024). "Theon, on the Composition of Purgative Medicines: An Unedited Text from Laur. Plut. 75.3". Medicina Nei Secoli: Journal of History of Medicine and Medical Humanities. 36 (3).
