= Muscio =

Muscio (also Mustio) is the supposed author of the Genecia (Gynaecia), a treatise of gynecology dating to ca. AD 500, preserved in a manuscript of ca. AD 900. The treatise borrows heavily from Soranus.

Nothing is known about the life of Muscio. Analysis of his vocabulary suggests that he may have come from North Africa. The usually cited 6th century date for his work is somewhat doubtful. His one surviving work is a simplified, and abbreviated, Latin translation of the Gynecology of Soranus. The first part is composed in a form of question-and-answer on many matters to do with female anatomy, embryology, and matters of birth and neonatal care. The second part covers pathological conditions. Numerous copies of this work from the ninth to the fifteenth century still survive, and it was the most important source for Eucharius Rösslin when he wrote his Rosengarten in 1513.

In Byzantine times, the work was translated into Greek, and, as a result, Muscio came to be thought of as Greek and wrongly identified with Moschion, a Greek physician mentioned by Soranus.
