= Soranus of Ephesus =

1st/2nd century AD Greek physician

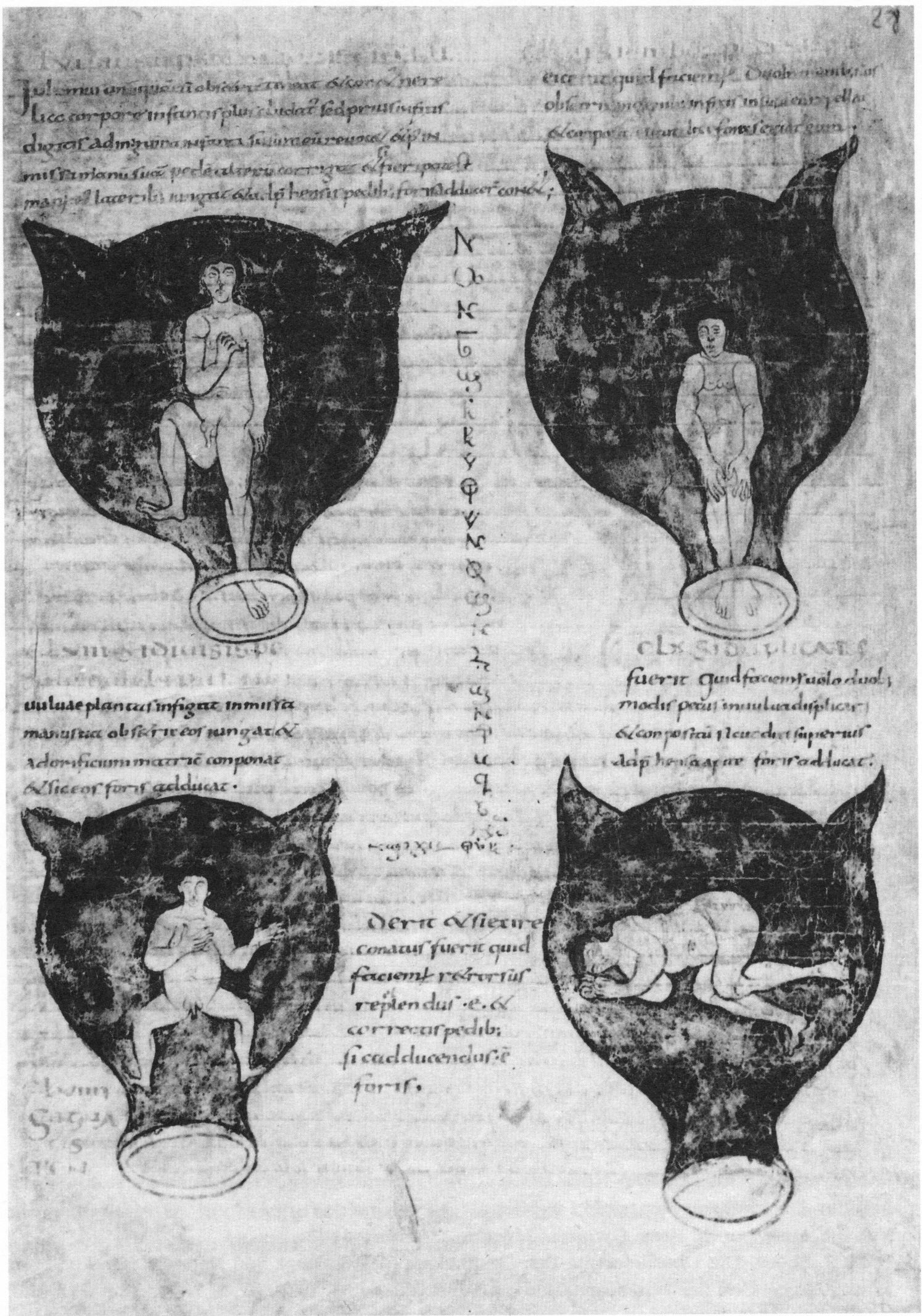
Soranus of Ephesus, Gynaecology, in a Latin version of late antiquity: positions of the embryo in the uterus. The illustrations in this manuscript of c. 900 are probably based on drawings by Soranus. Brussels, Bibliothèque Royale, Codex 3714, fol. 28r.

Soranus of Ephesus (Ancient Greek: Σωρανός ὁ Ἐφέσιος; fl. 1st/2nd century AD) was a Greek physician. He was born in Ephesus but practiced in Alexandria and subsequently in Rome, and was one of the chief representatives of the Methodic school of medicine. Several of his writings still survive, most notably his four-volume treatise on gynecology, and a Latin translation of his On Acute and Chronic Diseases.

== Life ==
Little is known about the life of Soranus. According to the Suda (which has two entries on him), he was a native of Ephesus, was the son of Menander and Phoebe, and practiced medicine at Alexandria and Rome in the reigns of Trajan and Hadrian (98–138). He lived at least as early as Archigenes, who used one of his medicines; he was tutor to Statilius Attalus of Heraclea, physician to Marcus Aurelius; and he was dead when Galen wrote his work De Methodo Medendi, c. 178.

He belonged to the Methodic school, and was one of the most eminent physicians of that school. Little else is known about his life, except that he passed some time in Aquitania for the purpose of treating some skin diseases, which were very prevalent there at the time.

== Works ==
His treatise Gynaecology is extant (first printed in 1838, later by V. Rose, in 1882, with a 6th-century Latin translation by one Muscio). Also extant are parts of treatises On Signs of Fractures and On Bandages. Of his most important work (On Acute and Chronic Diseases), only a few fragments in Greek remain, but there exists a complete Latin translation by Caelius Aurelianus (5th century). The Life of Hippocrates probably formed one of the collections of medical biographies by Soranus referred to in the Suda, and is valuable as the only authority for the life of the great physician, with the exception of articles in the Suda and in Stephanus of Byzantium (s.v. Κώς). The Introduction to the Science of Medicine is considered spurious.

Besides these works, Soranus was the author of several others, of which only the titles and some fragments have been preserved. Galen mentions two works on Pharmacy, from which he quotes some passages. Caelius Aurelianus quotes from several other works, and Soranus himself refers to many additional works which have not survived. Tertullian quotes a work, De Anima, in four books, in which Soranus divided the soul into seven parts, and denied its immortality. He is quoted by Paulus Aegineta, as being one of the earliest Greek medical writers who had described the Guinea worm; and he appears to have enjoyed a great reputation among the ancients, as Augustine calls him "Medicinae auctor nobilissimus," and Tertullian, "Methodicae Medicinae instructissimus auctor."

== See also ==
- History of embryology
- Women's medicine in antiquity
