= Ancient Greek medicine =

Collection of medical theories and practices in ancient Greece

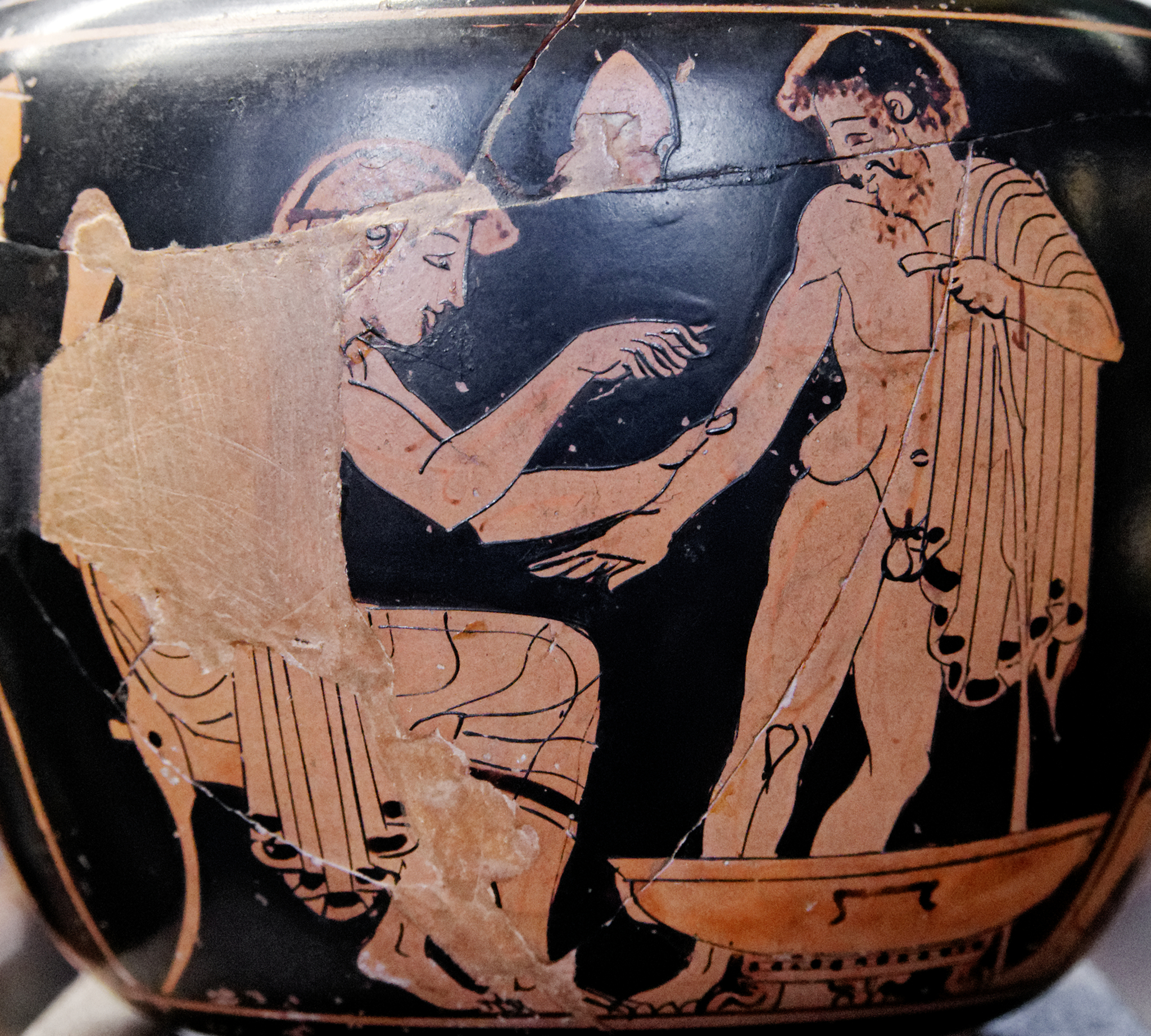
Physician treating a patient (Attic red-figure aryballos, 480–470 BC)

Ancient Greek medicine was a compilation of theories and practices that were constantly expanding through new ideologies and trials. The Greek term for medicine was iatrikē (Ancient Greek: ἰατρική). Many components were considered in ancient Greek medicine, intertwining the spiritual with the physical. Specifically, the ancient Greeks believed health was affected by the humors, geographic location, social class, diet, trauma, beliefs, and mindset. Early on the ancient Greeks believed that illnesses were "divine punishments" and that healing was a "gift from the Gods". As trials continued wherein theories were tested against symptoms and results, the pure spiritual beliefs regarding "punishments" and "gifts" were replaced with a foundation based in the physical, i.e., cause and effect.

== Asclepieia ==
Rod of Asclepius

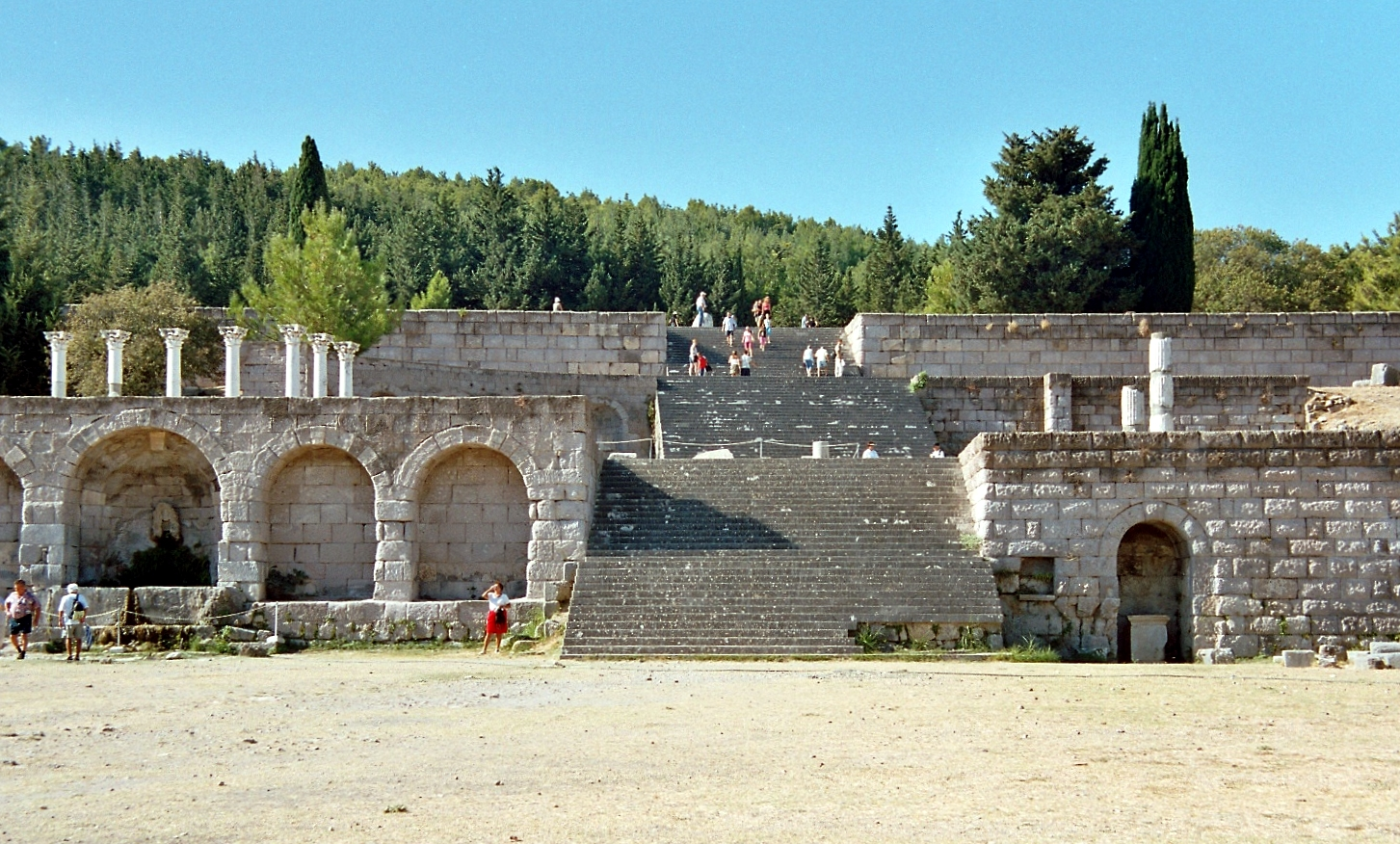
View of the Asklepieion of Kos, the best preserved instance of an Asclepieion

Asclepius was espoused as the first physician, and myth placed him as the son of Apollo. Temples dedicated to the healer-god Asclepius, known as Asclepieia (Greek: Ἀσκληπιεῖα; sing. Ἀσκληπιεῖον Asclepieion), functioned as centers of medical advice, prognosis, and healing. At these shrines, patients would enter a dream-like state of induced sleep known as "enkoimesis" (Greek: ἐγκοίμησις) not unlike anesthesia, in which they either received guidance from the deity in a dream or were cured by surgery. Asclepeia provided carefully controlled spaces conducive to healing and fulfilled several of the requirements of institutions created for healing. The Temple of Asclepius in Pergamum had a spring that flowed down into an underground room in the Temple. People would come to drink the waters and to bathe in them because they were believed to have medicinal properties. Mud baths and hot teas such as chamomile were used to calm them or peppermint tea to soothe their headaches, which is still a home remedy used by many today. The patients were also encouraged to sleep in the facilities. Their dreams were interpreted by the doctors and their symptoms were then reviewed. Dogs would occasionally be brought in to lick open wounds for assistance in their healing. In the Asclepieion of Epidaurus, three large marble boards dated to 350 BC preserve the names, case histories, complaints, and cures of about 70 patients who came to the temple with a problem and shed it there. Some of the surgical cures listed, such as the opening of an abdominal abscess or the removal of traumatic foreign material, are realistic enough to have taken place, but with the patient in a state of enkoimesis induced with the help of soporific substances such as opium.

The Rod of Asclepius is a universal symbol for medicine to this day. However, it is frequently confused with Caduceus, which was a staff wielded by the god Hermes. The Rod of Asclepius embodies one snake with no wings whereas Caduceus is represented by two snakes and a pair of wings depicting the swiftness of Hermes.

== Neurology in ancient Greece ==
While neurology did not formally emerge as a discipline until the 17th century with Thomas Willis, foundational neurological ideas and observations are evident in ancient Greek writings such as the Iliad and the Odyssey. Neurological thinking is prevalent in ancient Greece, beginning with Homers descriptions of the brain and head. In the Iliad, Homer describes battle injuries and neurological conditions that were not yet classified as neurology, but reflect neurological ideas. Homer frequently describes head injuries sustained in battle and notes that damage to the brain leads to confusion and disorientation. This is seen when he writes So, stung with agony the horse leapt on high as the arrow sank into his brain, and he threw into confusion horses and car as he writhed upon the bronze.

Homer did not specifically define the brain as an organ with a specific function in the nervous system, however, the word enkephalos, meaning "brain" appears several times in both the Iliad and the Odyssey. Throughout these passages, he acknowledges the brain and its importance, but does not assign it a distinct function.

The concept of vascular neurology also appears in Homer's Iliad. Several references to what is now known as amourosis fugax or temporary loss of vision are seen in the Iliad. For example, Achilles experienced a sudden loss of vision in his battle with Aenaes. Transient language disturbances which are temporary episodes of difficulty communicating are also explored in the Iliad; this is seen through a soldier's inability to speak when he learns of Patroclus's death.

These observations explain that while neurology as a concept was not yet defined in ancient Greece, Homer's work demonstrates an early understanding of neurological thought.

== Hippocratic medicine ==
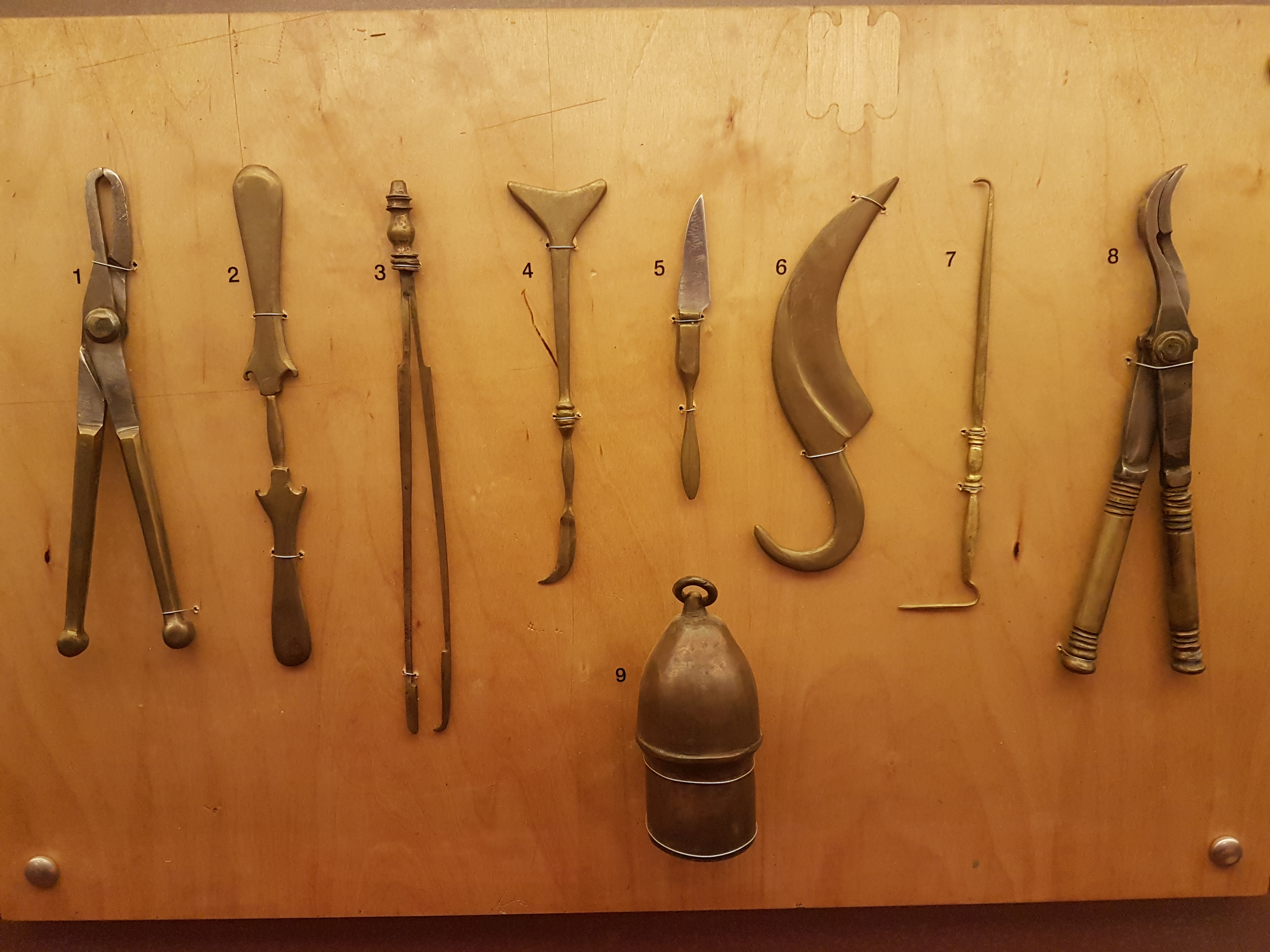
Surgical tools, 5th century BC. Reconstructions based on descriptions within the Hippocratic corpus. Thessaloniki Technology Museum.

The Hippocratic Corpus is a collection of about seventy early medical works from ancient Greece that are associated with Hippocrates and his students. It was primarily focused on pathology rather than creating a comprehensive physiology of the human body. Although once thought to have been written by Hippocrates himself, many scholars today believe that these texts were written by a series of authors over several decades. Thus its theories and concepts about the human body are not fully systematized and have some inconsistencies. Nonetheless, it is significant in that it was one of the first attempts to theorized a biological system and biological causes for disease in Greek science. This is stated in its treatise, "the Sacred Disease", which argues that if all diseases were derived from supernatural sources, biological medicines would not work.

The Hippocratic Corpus opposed ancient beliefs, offering biologically based approaches to disease instead of magical intervention. Ancient Greek physicians did not regard disease as being of supernatural origin, i.e., brought about from the dissatisfaction of the gods or demonic possession: "The Greeks developed a system of medicine based on an empirico-rational approach, such that they relied ever more on naturalistic observation, enhanced by practical trial and error experience, abandoning magical and religious justifications of human bodily dysfunction." However, in some instances, the fault of the ailment was still placed on the patient and the role of the physician was to conciliate with the gods or exorcise the demon with prayers, spells, and sacrifices.

=== Humoral theory ===
Humorism (or the four humors) refers to blood, phlegm, yellow bile and black bile. Each of the four humors were linked to an organ, temper, season and element. It was also theorized that sex played a role in medicine because some diseases and treatments were different for females than for males. Moreover, geographic location and social class affected the living conditions of the people and might subject them to different environmental issues such as mosquitoes, rats, and availability of clean drinking water. Diet was thought to be an issue as well and might be affected by a lack of access to adequate nourishment. Trauma, such as that suffered by gladiators, from dog bites or other injuries, played a role in theories relating to understanding anatomy and infections. Additionally, there was significant focus on the beliefs and mindset of the patient in the diagnosis and treatment theories. It was recognized that the mind played a role in healing, or that it might also be the sole basis for the illness.

Ancient Greek medicine began to revolve around the theory of humors. The humoral theory states that good health comes from a perfect balance of the four humors: blood, phlegm, yellow bile, and black bile. Consequently, poor health resulted from improper balance of the four humors. Hippocrates, known as the "Father of Modern Medicine", established a medical school at Cos and is the most important figure in ancient Greek medicine. Hippocrates and his students documented numerous illnesses in the Hippocratic Corpus, and developed the Hippocratic Oath for physicians, which is still in use today. He and his students also created medical terminology that is part of our vocabulary today. Medical words included acute, chronic, epidemic, exacerbation, relapse, and others. The contributions to ancient Greek medicine of Hippocrates, Socrates and others had a lasting influence on Islamic medicine and medieval European medicine until many of their findings eventually became obsolete in the 14th century.

The establishment of the humoral theory of medicine focused on the balance between blood, yellow and black bile, and phlegm in the human body. Being too hot, cold, dry or wet disturbed the balance between the humors, resulting in disease and illness. Gods and demons were not believed to punish the patient, but attributed to bad air (miasma theory). Physicians who practiced humoral medicine focused on reestablishing balance between the humors. The shift from supernatural disease to biological disease did not completely abolish Greek religion, but offered a new method of how physicians interacted with patients.

Ancient Greek physicians who followed humorism emphasized the importance of environment. Physicians believed patients would be subjected to various diseases based on the environment they resided. The local water supply and the direction the wind blew influenced the health of the local populace.

=== Female biology ===
Due to its primary focus on pathology (rather than physiology), Hippocratic theories on the female anatomy were generally not fully comprehensive. However, there were some consistent themes to their theories of the female body. In particular, Hippocratic authors had similar views of menstruation, the development of breasts, and the nature of the womb. Hippocratic views in the breasts and menstruation were rooted in an assumption that the flesh of a woman was of a completely different essential nature (or physis) compared to that of a man. for instance, they believed women's flesh to be "spongy, loose and porous" (Diseases of Women 1.1 (=8.2) whereas the flesh of a man was more firm and compact. It was believed that this nature of female flesh caused it to soak up excess blood generated by the body, which was then expelled through menstruation as a way of regulating the blood humor. Likewise the "looseness" of female flesh was used to account for the existence of female breasts. It was believed that in both male and female bodies, the breast was a gland that absorbs fluids and moisture, and thus the loose porous nature of women's flesh allowed their breast to absorb more and grow larger. Finally, in regards to the womb, Hippocratic scholars believed the wandering womb theory; that it was a detached organ within the female body and had the ability to migrate. The migration of the womb was assumed to be the cause of many maladies and symptoms of discomfort or bad mood in women.

These Hippocratic theories assumed that the male body was the normal/ideal body, and that female differences were abnormal and inferior. Thus Hippocratic theories of female anatomy aligned with the patriarchal views of female inferiority in ancient Greek society. For instance the theory on the 'loose and porous nature' of women's flesh was framed as a general inefficiency in female bodies compared to the more fit and tight male body, which was better at managing its humors. Menstruation was seen as an adaptation to an inherently inferior constitution that did not manage the blood humor well. It was assumed that these inefficiencies in the female body made them unfit for male labor or male roles. Likewise, the theory that the womb migrated was partially based on observations that the male body did not contain a womb. Because the male body was seen as "the norm", it was assumed that the womb had no specified place in the body and thus naturally migrated.

These patriarchal views, consequentially, affected Hippocratic conceptions about the nature of afflictions that women experienced, as well as the remedies for these afflictions.

==== Female afflictions and cures ====
The concept of humoral imbalance played a crucial role in the diagnosis and treatment of women in ancient Greek society. As blood is one of the four humors, humoral imbalances involving the blood were seen as a reason for a woman to become manic with changes in mood. Blood's relationship to the uterus was considered crucial to the well-being and health of the individual. Hippocrates stated that if a woman's period blood is not expelled from her body in full amount, it would rush to her heart and to her lungs, causing her affected organs to slow down; this would lead to shivering and fevers called 'erratic fevers' which would instill feelings of murderous feelings of madness because she tries to choke herself with the blood, leaving evil to set in on itself due to the bad condition of the blood.

Medical treatments for women were generally womb-centered and focused on the misplacement of the uterus, also known as the wandering womb. In ancient Greek medicine, women were thought to contain an organ that resembles an animal, for it would move to its own accord and is often subject to displacement. It is attracted to pleasant smells, causing the womb to move closer to it and repelled from putrid smells, causing it to flee. This belief led to the treatment using sweet smells held above the vagina as a means to entice the womb to move back down if it is choking the thorax and pungent smells held below the nose for the same reason of it being prolapsed. Symptoms from a woman's womb moving upwards includes sluggishness, vertigo, headache, and exhaustion while symptoms for the womb moving down to the hypochondriac regions include heartburn, irregular and intermittent heartbeat, loss of speech, choking, and death.

One of the medical treatments for a prolapsed womb was to put the woman in a vapor bath, then put wild figs into wine, then boil it, and then cut a hole at the top of the container used to store the wine, typically a gourd; the vapor from the wine must reach through the channel and reach the womb; following this procedure was the implementation of inflammatory drugs to induce menstruation through a culmination of cow dung, beef bile, myrrh, galbanum, and anything similar.

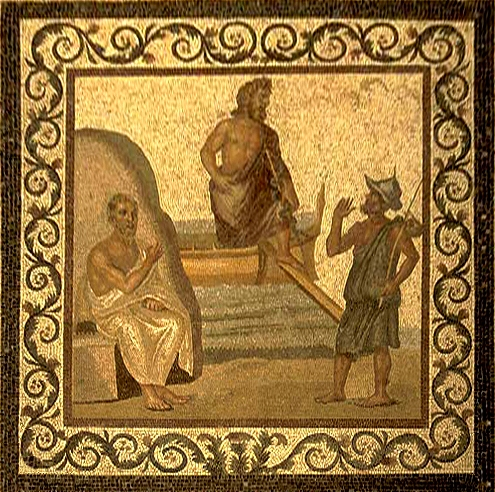
Asclepius (center) arrives in Kos and is greeted by Hippocrates (left) and a citizen (right), mosaic from the Asclepieion of Kos, 2nd–3rd century AD.

=== Herodicus ===
Herodicus (Greek: Ἡρóδιĸος) was a Greek physician of the 5th century BC, who is considered to be the father of sports medicine. The first use of therapeutic exercise for the treatment of disease and maintenance of health is credited to him, and he is believed to have been one of the tutors of Hippocrates. He also recommended good diet and massage using beneficial herbs and oils, and his theories are considered the foundation of sports medicine. He was specific in the manner that a massage should be given. He recommended that rubbing be initially slow and gentle, then subsequently faster, with the application of more pressure, which was to be followed by more gentle friction.

== Aristotle ==
Ancient Greek philosopher Aristotle was the most influential scholar of the living world from antiquity. Aristotle's biological writings demonstrate great concern for empiricism, biological causation, and the diversity of life. He made countless observations of nature, especially the habits and attributes of plants and animals in the world around him, which he devoted considerable attention to categorizing. In all, Aristotle classified 540 animal species, and dissected at least 50.

Due to Aristotle's interest in creating a more systemic empirical understanding of nature, his theories of female anatomy were generally more consistently grounded in observation compared to Hippocratic theories. The primary difference between Aristotle's concept of the female body and a Hippocratic concept was that his saw the female body as being from the same general physis (or same essential biological system) as the male one, with variation existing primarily in sexual organs. Likewise, unlike Hippocratic theorist, he believed the womb to be a natural part of the female body that was normally fixed in place (like the womb of other animals), though it could be displaced due to certain health conditions. However, Aristotle's theories of female anatomy were still inflected with patriarchal values of Greek society. For instance, mensuration was still seen as evidence of inefficiencies of female biology. Though it was no longer seen as the result of inherently inferior constitution, menstruation was now seen as the cause of "physical weakness" when compared to men. Likewise, some of Aristotle's theories on differences in biological sex seem to be based entirely on patriarchal assumptions of male superiority, rather that empirical evidence. For instance, in his writings "History of Animals" he states that men have more skull sutures than women, which demonstrates a larger brain and thinking capacity. However, there is no actual observable difference in the number of skull sutures in men or women. He likewise claims that men have more teeth than women, which correlates with a longer lifespan in men, despite the fact that both men and women have the same number of teeth.

== Herophilus, Erasistratus and ancient Greek anatomy ==
Despite their known respect for ancient Egyptian medicine, attempts to discern any particular influence on Greek practice at this early time have not been dramatically successful because of the lack of sources and the challenge of understanding ancient medical terminology. It is clear, however, that the Greeks imported Egyptian substances into their pharmacopoeia, and the influence became more pronounced after the establishment of a school of Greek medicine in Alexandria.

Nomenclature, methods and applications for the study of anatomy all date back to the Greeks. The first medical teacher at Alexandria was Herophilus of Chalcedon (the father of anatomy), who differed from Aristotle, placing intelligence in the brain, and connected the nervous system to motion and sensation. Herophilus also distinguished between veins and arteries, noting that the latter had a pulse while the former do not. He did this using an experiment involving cutting certain veins and arteries in a pig's neck until the squealing stopped. In the same vein, he developed a diagnostic technique which relied upon distinguishing different types of pulse. He, and his contemporary, Erasistratus of Chios, researched the role of veins and nerves, mapping their courses across the body.

Erasistratus connected the increased complexity of the surface of the human brain compared to other animals to its superior intelligence. He sometimes employed experiments to further his research, at one time repeatedly weighing a caged bird and noting its weight loss between feeding times. Following his teacher's researches into pneumatics, he claimed that the human system of blood vessels was controlled by vacuums, drawing blood across the body. In Erasistratus' physiology, air enters the body, is then drawn by the lungs into the heart, where it is transformed into vital spirit, and is then pumped by the arteries throughout the body. Some of this vital spirit reaches the brain, where it is transformed into animal spirit, which is then distributed by the nerves. Herophilus and Erasistratus performed their experiments upon criminals given to them by their Ptolemaic kings. They dissected these criminals alive, and "while they were still breathing they observed parts which nature had formerly concealed, and examined their position, colour, shape, size, arrangement, hardness, softness, smoothness, connection."

== In the Roman Empire ==
Through long contact with Greek culture, and their eventual conquest of Greece, the Romans adopted a favorable view of Hippocratic medicine. This acceptance led to the spread of Greek medical theories throughout the Roman Empire, and thus a large portion of the West. The most influential Roman scholar to continue and expand on the Hippocratic tradition was Galen (d. c. 207). Not all Roman perspectives were favorable toward Greek medicine. The Roman author and natural philosopher Pliny the Elder was a vocal critic, suggesting that Greek doctors were unskilled and motivated by profit rather than healing. In his Natural History, Pliny expressed concerns about Greek practitioners, accusing them of exploiting patients rather than genuinely caring for their health. Nevertheless, historian of medicine Vivian Nutton cautions against taking Pliny's criticism at face value, noting that it underestimates the substantial contributions of Greek physicians. Archaeological findings, including Greek inscriptions on doctors' tombstones, suggest that at least 10% of known medical inscriptions in the Roman Empire were Greek, indicating the prominence and impact of Greek practitioners within Roman society.

=== Dioscorides ===
The first century AD Greek physician, pharmacologist, botanist, and Roman army surgeon Pedanius Dioscorides authored an encyclopedia of medicinal substances commonly known as De Materia Medica. This work did not delve into medical theory or explanation of pathogenesis, but described the uses and actions of some 600 plants and drugs, based on empirical observation. Unlike other works of classical antiquity, Dioscorides' manuscript was never out of publication; it formed the basis for the Western pharmacopeia through the 19th century, a true testament to the efficacy of the medicines described; moreover, the influence of work on European herbal medicine eclipsed that of the Hippocratic Corpus.

=== Galen ===
Aelius Galenus was a prominent Greek physician, surgeon and philosopher in the Roman Empire. Arguably the most accomplished of all medical researchers of antiquity, Galen influenced the development of various scientific disciplines, including anatomy, physiology, pathology, pharmacology, and neurology, as well as philosophy and logic.

Galen also spent over 50 years in Rome, where he served as a physician to Roman emperors. Galen's extensive body of work, originally written in Greek, provided a foundation for the preservation of medical knowledge that would later be translated into Latin. These translations facilitated the enduring legacy of Greek medical ideas in Roman and, ultimately, in Western medical traditions.

The son of Aelius Nicon, a wealthy architect with scholarly interests, Galen received a comprehensive education that prepared him for a successful career as a physician and philosopher. Born in Pergamon (present-day Bergama, Turkey), Galen traveled extensively, exposing himself to a wide variety of medical theories and discoveries before settling in Rome, where he served prominent members of Roman society and eventually was given the position of personal physician to several emperors.

Galen's understanding of anatomy and medicine was principally influenced by the then-current theory of humorism, as advanced by ancient Greek physicians such as Hippocrates. His theories dominated and influenced Western medical science for more than 1,300 years. His anatomical reports, based mainly on dissection of monkeys, especially the Barbary macaque, and pigs, remained uncontested until 1543, when printed descriptions and illustrations of human dissections were published in the seminal work De humani corporis fabrica by Andreas Vesalius where Galen's physiological theory was accommodated to these new observations. Galen's theory of the physiology of the circulatory system endured until 1628, when William Harvey published his treatise entitled De motu cordis, in which he established that blood circulates, with the heart acting as a pump. Medical students continued to study Galen's writings until well into the 19th century. Galen conducted many nerve ligation experiments that supported the theory, which is still accepted today, that the brain controls all the motions of the muscles by means of the cranial and peripheral nervous systems.

Galen saw himself as both a physician and a philosopher, as he wrote in his treatise entitled That the Best Physician is also a Philosopher. Galen was very interested in the debate between the rationalist and empiricist medical sects, and his use of direct observation, dissection and vivisection represents a complex middle ground between the extremes of those two viewpoints.

== Historical legacy ==
Study of Hippocratic and Galenic texts all but disappeared in the Latin West in the Early Middle Ages, following the collapse of the Western Empire, although the Hippocratic–Galenic tradition of Greek medicine continued to be studied and practiced in the Eastern Roman Empire (Byzantium). After AD 750, Arab, Persian and Andalusi scholars translated Galen's and Dioscorides' works in particular. Thereafter the Hippocratic-Galenic medical tradition was assimilated and eventually expanded, with the most influential Muslim doctor-scholar being Avicenna.

Beginning in the late eleventh century, the Hippocratic–Galenic tradition returned to the Latin West with a series of translations of the classical texts, mainly from Arabic translations but occasionally from the original Greek. In the Renaissance, more translations of Galen and Hippocrates directly from the Greek were made from newly available Byzantine manuscripts. Galen's influence was so great that even after Western Europeans started making dissections in the thirteenth century, scholars often assimilated findings into the Galenic model that otherwise might have thrown Galen's accuracy into doubt. Over time, however, classical medical theory came to be superseded by increasing emphasis on scientific experimental methods in the 16th and 17th centuries. Nevertheless, the Hippocratic–Galenic practice of bloodletting was practiced into the 19th century, despite its empirical ineffectiveness and riskiness.

== See also ==
- History of medicine
- On Ancient Medicine (Hippocratic Corpus)
- Unani
- Phanostratê
