= Aleshire =

Aleshire is an English surname. Notable people with the surname include:

- James B. Aleshire (1856–1925), US Army major general
- Arthur W. Aleshire (1900–1940), American politician
- Lennie Aleshire (1890–1987), American vaudeville and country music performer
- Sara B. Aleshire (1947–1997), American epigrapher and historian of Greek religion
