= 2nd-century Roman domes =

Roman architectural features

Segmented domes made of radially concave wedges, or of alternating concave and flat wedges, appear under Hadrian in the 2nd century and most preserved examples of the style date from this period. The Pantheon in Rome was completed by Emperor Hadrian and the largest Roman dome.

In the middle of the 2nd century, some of the largest domes were built near present-day Naples, as part of large bath complexes taking advantage of the volcanic hot springs in the area. At the bath complex at Baiae, there are remains of a collapsed dome spanning 26.3 meters (86 ft), called the "Temple of Venus", and a larger half-collapsed dome spanning 29.5 meters (97 ft) called the "Temple of Diana". The dome of the "Temple of Diana", which may have been a nymphaeum as part of the bath complex, can be seen to have had an ogival section made of horizontal layers of mortared brick and capped with light tufa. It dates to the second half of the 2nd century and was the third largest dome known from its time. The second largest was the collapsed "Temple of Apollo" built nearby along the shore of Lake Avernus. The span cannot be precisely measured due to its ruined state, but it was more than 36 meters (118 ft) in diameter.

In the second half of the 2nd century in North Africa, a distinctive type of nozzle tube shape was developed in the tradition of the terracotta tube dome at the Hellenistic era baths of Morgantina, an idea that had been preserved in the use of interlocking terracotta pots for kiln roofs. This tube could be mass-produced on potter's wheels and interlocked to form a permanent centering for concrete domes, avoiding the use of wooden centering altogether. This spread mainly in the western Mediterranean.

After the second half of the 2nd century, oculus openings became less of a practical feature in domes than a design element.

Although rarely used, the pendentive dome was known in 2nd century Roman architecture and possibly earlier, in funerary monuments such as the Sedia dei Diavolo and the Torracio della Secchina on the Via Nomentana. Pendentive domes would be used much more widely in the Byzantine period. A "Roman tomb in Palestine at Kusr-en-Nêuijîs" had a pendentive dome over the square intersection of cruciform barrel vaults and has been dated to the 2nd century. A small dome on spherical pendentives at Beurey-Beauguay on the Côte-d'Or department of France has been dated to the 2nd or 3rd century. A stone voussoir dome over the caldarium of the West Bath of Jerash has been dated to the second century. One of apparently three domes in the west bath complex, the northern 6.9 meter diameter sail vault has survived intact.

== Trajan ==
During the reign of Emperor Trajan, domes and semi-domes over exedras were standard elements of Roman architecture, possibly due to the efforts of Trajan's architect, Apollodorus of Damascus, who was famed for his engineering ability. Two rotundas 20 meters (66 ft) in diameter were finished in 109 AD as part of the Baths of Trajan, built over the Domus Aurea, and exedras 13 and 18 meters (43 and 59 ft) wide were built as part of the markets north-east of his forum. The architecture of Trajan's successor, Hadrian, continued this style. Three 100-foot (30 m) wide exedras at Trajan's Baths have patterns of coffering that, as in the later Pantheon, align with lower niches only on the axes and diagonals and, also as in the Pantheon, that alignment is sometimes with the ribs between the coffers, rather than with the coffers themselves. Apollodorus may have designed the two 150-foot (46 m) wide wooden half-domes on the exedras of Trajan's Basilica Ulpia, but no documents concerning these structures have survived.

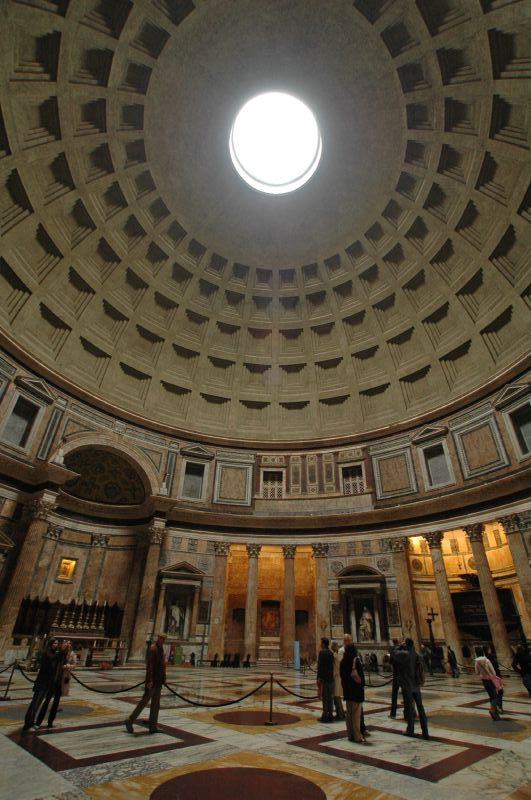
The Pantheon in Rome

Although considered an example of Hadrianic architecture, there is brickstamp evidence that the rebuilding of the Pantheon in its present form was begun under Trajan. Speculation that the architect of the Pantheon was Apollodorus has not been proven, although there are stylistic commonalities between his large coffered half-domes at Trajan's Baths and the dome of the Pantheon. Other indicators that the designer was either Apollodorus or someone in his circle who was "closer in artistic sensibility to Trajan’s era than Hadrian’s" are the monumental size and the incorporation of tiny passages in the structure. The building's dimensions seem to reference Archimedes' treatise On the Sphere and Cylinder and the design balances its complexity with underlying geometrical simplicity. The dome may use rows of 28 coffers because 28 was considered by the Pythagoreans to be a perfect number. Hadrian was an amateur architect and it was apparently domes of Hadrian's like the later examples at his villa in Tivoli that Apollodorus derisively called gourds prior to Hadrian becoming emperor. According to Cassius Dio, the memory of this insult contributed to Hadrian as emperor having Apollodorus exiled and killed. The exile is believed to have occurred in 121 and the execution in 125. The inscription on the Pantheon falsely attributed this third building at the site to the builder of the first, Marcus Agrippa.

== Hadrian ==
The Pantheon in Rome, completed by Emperor Hadrian as part of the Baths of Agrippa, has the most famous, best preserved, and largest Roman dome. It was completed in 125. Its diameter was more than twice as wide as any known earlier dome. The dome of the Pantheon is unreinforced concrete spanning 43.4 meters (142 ft) and resting on a circular wall, or rotunda, 6 meters (20 ft) thick. This rotunda, made of brick-faced concrete, contains a large number of relieving arches and voids. Seven interior niches and the entrance way divide the wall structurally into eight virtually independent piers. These openings and additional voids account for a quarter of the rotunda wall's volume. The only opening in the dome is the brick-lined oculus at the top, 9 meters (30 ft) in diameter, that provides light and ventilation for the interior. The shallow coffering in the dome accounts for a less than five percent reduction in the dome's mass, and is mostly decorative. The aggregate material hand-placed in the concrete is heaviest at the base of the dome and changes to lighter materials as the height increases, dramatically reducing the stresses in the finished structure. Descriptions from the 16th to the 19th centuries attest to evidence of hooks and cramps located in the coffers, which has led to speculation that stars or rosettes were originally attached. Restoration of the coffers has removed this evidence.

The function of the Pantheon remains an open question. Strangely for a temple, its inscription does not mention any god or group of gods. Its name, Pantheon, comes from the Greek for "all gods" but is unofficial, and it was not included in the list of temples restored by Hadrian in the Historia Augusta. Circular temples were small and rare, and Roman temples traditionally allowed for only one divinity per room. The Pantheon more resembles structures found in imperial palaces and baths. Hadrian is believed to have held court in the rotunda using the main apse opposite the entrance as a tribune, which may explain its very large size. Later Roman buildings similar to the Pantheon include a temple to Asklepios Soter (c. 145) in the old Hellenistic city of Pergamon and the so-called "Round Temple" at Ostia (c. 230–240), which may have been related to the Imperial cult. The Pergamon dome was about 80 Roman feet wide, versus about 150 for the Pantheon, and made of brick over a cut stone rotunda. The Ostia dome was 60 Roman feet wide and made of brick-faced concrete. No later dome built in the Imperial era came close to the span of the Pantheon. It remained the largest dome in the world for more than a millennium and is still the world's largest unreinforced concrete dome.

Many commentators have cited the Pantheon as an example of the revolutionary possibilities for monolithic architecture provided by the use of Roman pozzolana concrete. However, vertical cracks seem to have developed very early, such that in practice the dome acts as an array of arches with a common keystone, rather than as a single unit. The exterior step-rings used to compress the "haunches" of the dome, which would not be necessary if the dome acted as a monolithic structure, may be an acknowledgement of this by the builders themselves. Such buttressing was common in Roman arch construction. The cracks in the dome can be seen from the upper internal chambers of the rotunda, but have been covered by re-rendering on the inside surface of the dome and by patching on the outside of the building. The building was consecrated as the Church of Sancta Maria ad Martyres by Pope Boniface IV in 613, after being closed by Emperor Theodosius I at the end of the 4th century. The Pantheon's roof was originally covered with gilt bronze tiles, but these were removed in 663 by Emperor Constans II and replaced with lead roofing.

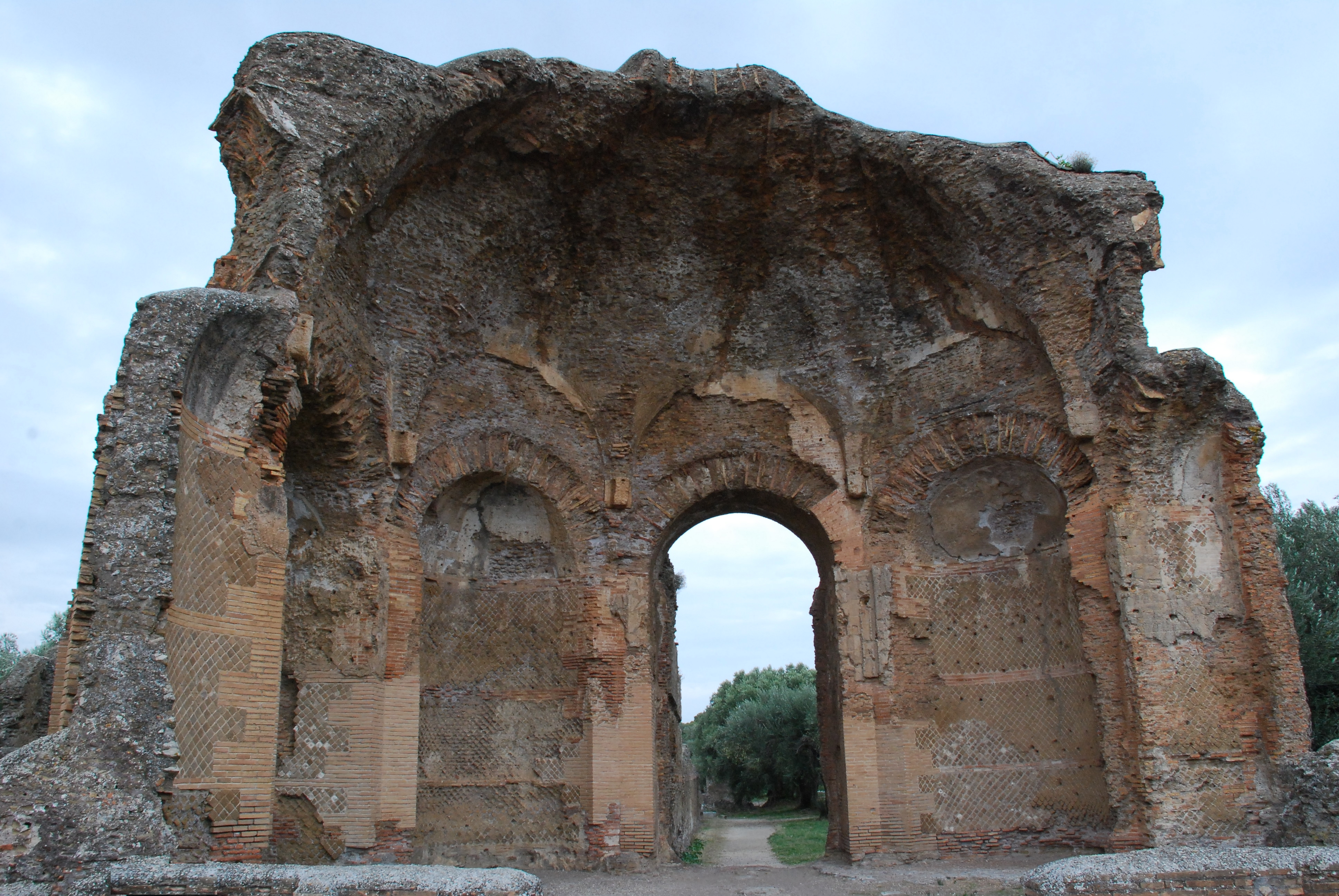
Piazza d'Oro vestibule ruins at Hadrian's Villa

Hadrian's architecture includes a variety of innovative domes used in baths, triclinia, temples, and nymphaea. At Hadrian's Villa in Tivoli, examples include an octagonal vestibule at the Piazza d'Oro, or Golden Court, about 35.7 pedes in diameter, an octagonal hall of the Small Baths about 35 pedes in diameter, and a semi-dome at the Serapeum-Canopus complex about 56 pedes in diameter. Use of concrete facilitated the complex geometry of the octagonal domed hall at the villa's Small Thermal Baths. The vaulting has collapsed, but a virtual reconstruction suggests that the walls of the octagonal hall, which alternate flat and convex, merged into a spherical cap. The inner surface of the Heliocaminus Bath dome at the villa was covered by bessales tiles between 125 and 133. Hadrian's villa has examples of segmented domes made of radially concave wedges, or of alternating concave and flat wedges, at the Piazza d'Oro and in the semidome of the Serapeum. Recorded details of the decoration of the segmented dome at the Piazza d'Oro suggests it was made to evoke a billowing tent, perhaps in imitation of the canopies used by Hellenistic kings. Other examples exist at the Hadrianic baths of Otricoli and the so-called "Temple of Venus" at Baiae. This style of dome required complex centering and radially oriented formwork to create its tight curves, and the earliest surviving direct evidence of radial formwork is found at the caldarium of the Large Baths at Hadrian's villa.

Two domed towers at the Red Basilica in Pergamon used radially laid bricks and concrete to form hemispheres 12 meters in diameter with central oculi. They are dated to the reign of Hadrian.

Hadrian may have added an upper story over the Sunken Peristyle of the Flavian Palace, with two domed nymphaea in the rooms adjoining it to the northeast.

The dome at the Villa delle Vignacce on the Via Latina included one of the earliest uses of amphorae to lighten the structure.

== Antonine dynasty ==
Octagonal rooms of the Baths of Antoninus in Carthage were covered with cloister vaults and have been dated to 145–160. The domes had oculus apertures with glass windows.

In Pergamon, south of the Temple of Zeus-Asklepios, a healing building was built in the second half of the 2nd century with a concrete dome 27 meters in diameter supported by eight pillars.

== See also ==
- List of Roman domes
- History of architecture
