= Sleep temple =

Coordinates: 36°52′33″N 27°15′25″E

Sleep temples (also known as dream temples or Egyptian sleep temples) are regarded by some as an early instance of hypnosis over 4000 years ago, under the influence of Imhotep. Imhotep served as Chancellor and as High Priest of the sun god Ra at Heliopolis. He was said to be a son of the ancient Egyptian demiurge Ptah, his mother being a mortal named Khredu-ankh.

Sleep temples were hospitals of sorts, healing a variety of ailments, perhaps many of them psychological in nature. Patients were taken to an unlit chamber to sleep and be treated for their specific ailment.The treatment involved chanting, placing the patient into a trance-like or hypnotic state, and analysing their dreams in order to determine treatment. Meditation, fasting, baths, and sacrifices to the patron deity or other spirits were often involved as well.

Sleep temples also existed in the Middle East and Ancient Greece. In Greece, they were built in honor of Asclepios, the Greek god of medicine and were called Asclepieions. The Greek treatment was referred to as incubation and focused on prayers to Asclepios for healing. These sleep chambers were filled with snakes, a symbol to Asclepios. A similar Hebrew treatment was referred to as Kavanah and involved focusing on letters of the Hebrew alphabet spelling the name of their God.

== Greek healing sanctuaries ==
A large network of Asclepieia existed across the ancient Greek and Roman worlds. One modern overview describes a sacred healthcare network of over 300 Asclepieia throughout ancient Greece, the eastern Mediterranean, and the Roman world. Among the most frequently cited major centers are Epidaurus, Kos, Athens, Corinth, and Pergamon.

In addition to sacred buildings (temple, altar, and sleeping quarters such as the abaton or enkoimeterion), some sanctuaries included infrastructure for physical activity and communal life, including theatres, odeia, stadia, hippodromes, gymnasia, and palaestrae, as well as dining halls where pilgrims consumed sacrificial meat.

== Sources and healing accounts ==
Information about rituals and healing practices in Asclepieia comes from archaeological remains, inscriptions (such as dedications, hymns, healing narratives, and sacred regulations), and ancient literary texts.

One of the most important inscription types is the Epidaurian healing inscriptions, often called iamata. These texts describe individual healing cases and are commonly linked by modern scholars to incubation practices. Many survive only in fragmentary condition, limiting full reconstruction of all recorded cases.

Some descriptions of healing rituals also appear in literary works, including the comedy Plutus by Aristophanes. Scholars suggest that parts of the healing scene may reflect real sanctuary practices, although the depiction of direct divine intervention is likely dramatic invention.

Modern sleep medicine research discusses Greek incubation (enkoimesis) as a structured practice of sleeping in a sacred space to obtain revelatory dreams. Ancient medical writers such as Hippocrates also described sleep as an important element of physical recovery and healing.

== Therapeutic practices ==
Healing at Asclepieia involved more than dream experiences alone. Visitors underwent purification rituals and could receive recommendations for exercise, massage, fasting, bathing, herbal remedies, or surgical treatment, depending on the illness. As practical medicine developed, some sanctuaries employed physicians alongside priests. Surviving inscriptions refer to treatment for conditions such as headaches, pregnancy complications, arthritis, blindness, paralysis, wounds, and abscesses.

A well-known Roman-era inscription from Epidaurus records the case of Marcus Julius Apellas (2nd century AD), describing a multi-day therapeutic regimen including dietary instructions, walking exercises, bathing routines, topical treatments, and payment of medical fees. Scholars note that these instructions resemble contemporary medical practice and illustrate the overlap between religious ritual and clinical care.

== Lydney Park (Roman Britain) ==
In 1928, Mortimer Wheeler unearthed a Roman sleep temple at Lydney Park, Gloucestershire, with the assistance of a young J.R.R. Tolkien. The temple complex excavated at Lydney Park is commonly linked to the cult of the god Nodens. Scholarly studies note that J. R. R. Tolkien contributed a linguistic appendix on the name Nodens to the excavation report prepared by the Wheelers. Later research has also examined the site’s buildings, including a bath-house and a structure interpreted as a sleeping area (abaton), within the wider context of the sanctuary.

== See also ==
- Asclepieion
- Dream interpretation
