= Asclepieion of Athens =

Ancient Greek sanctuary by the Acropolis

Coordinates: 37°58′15″N 23°43′37″E

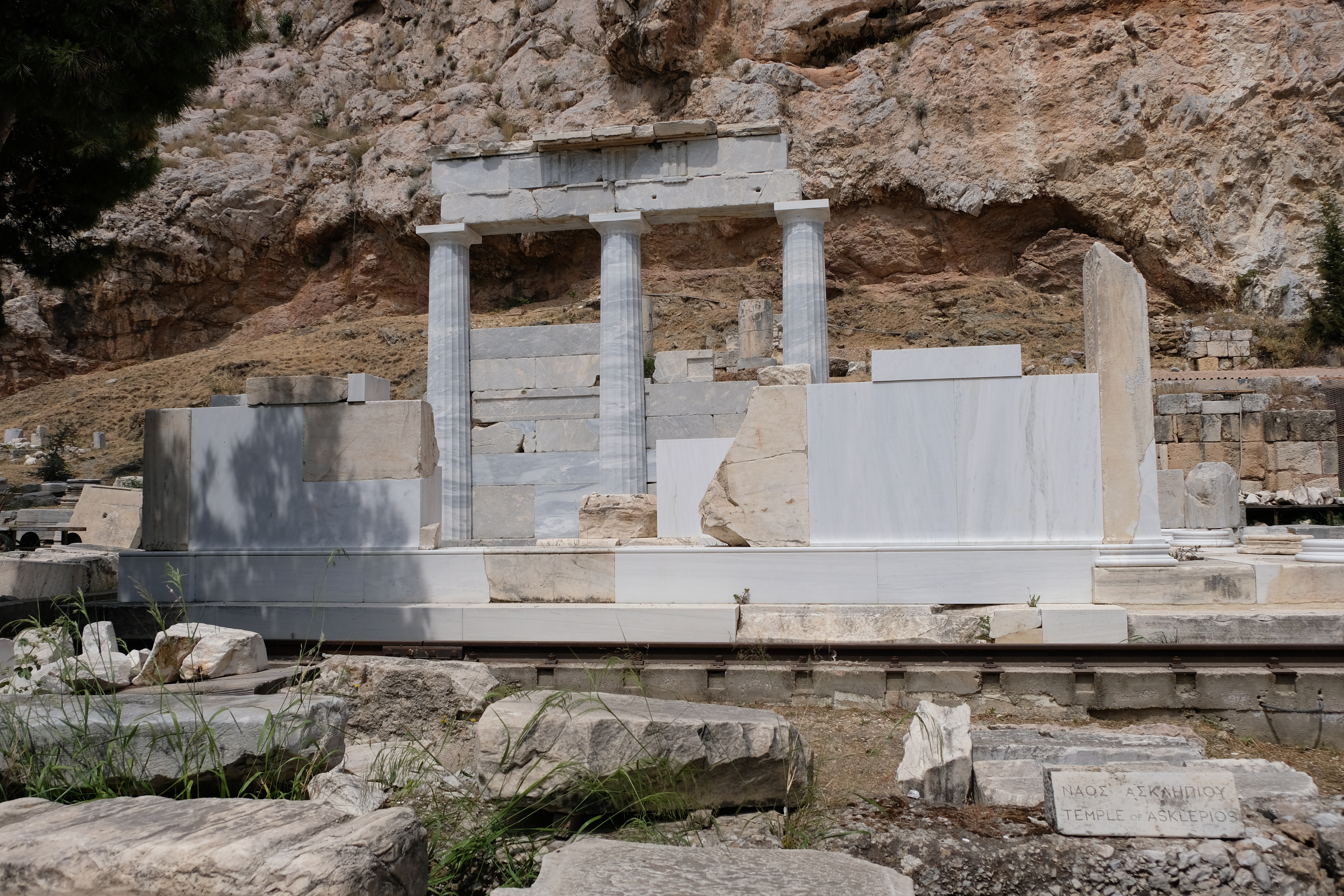
Current state of restoration of the Asklepeion.

The Asclepieion of Athens was an ancient Greek temple in Athens built to honour of the gods Asclepius and Hygieia, located west of the Theatre of Dionysos and east of the Pelargikon wall on the southern escarpment of the Acropolis hill. It later became a Christian church in the sixth century.

== History ==
The Asclepieion was one of several asklepieia in the ancient Greek world that served as rudimentary hospitals. It was founded in the year 419–18 BCE during the Peloponnesian War, perhaps as a direct result of the plague, by Telemachos Acharneas. An account of the foundation is inscribed in the Telemachos Monument, a double-sided, marble pillar which is topped by reliefs depicting the arrival of the god in Athens from Epidaurus and his reception by Telemachos. The sanctuary complex consisted of the temple and the altar of the god as well as two galleries, the Doric stoa which served as a katagogion, a space where visitors seeking healing would spend the night in the hope of seeing the god in their dreams and being healed by him, and the Ionic Stoa that served as a dining hall and lodging for the priests of Asclepius and their visitors.

The Doric stoa was built according to inscriptions in 300/299 BCE and was a two-storey building with 17 Doric columns on its façade. This is framed by the sacred spring at its eastern end and a pit lined with masonry at its western end. The sacred spring is a small cave cut into the rock behind the stoa, which contains a natural spring. The circular well or pit, a deep hollow with polygonal masonry built into the cliff face, was accessed from the second floor of the Doric stoa and its date is disputed between the last quarter of the 5th century and 300/399 BCE. F Robert proposed that it was a place devoted to the celebration of Heroes in the Asklepeion during the Heroa, which witnessed sacrifices to the chthonic gods and heroes, as testified epigraphically.

The Ionian stoa, west of the temple, is dated to the last quarter of the 5th century. At the west side of the sanctuary was a propylon which allowed visitors to access the sanctuary from the roadway to the south. According to epigraphic evidence, the propylon was renovated in Roman times.

At the beginning of the 6th c. CE, when Christian worship succeeded the ancient, all the monuments of Asclepius were demolished and the material incorporated into the complex of a large, three-aisled Early Christian basilica. In the Byzantine years (11th and 13th centuries) two smaller, single-aisled temples occupied the position of the basilica, while the latter of them functioned as the catholicon of a small monastery. Since 2002, partial restorations have been undertaken to the west end of the ground floor of the Doric Stoa façade, the room of the Sacred Cave on the first floor of the Doric Stoa and the temple of Asclepius.

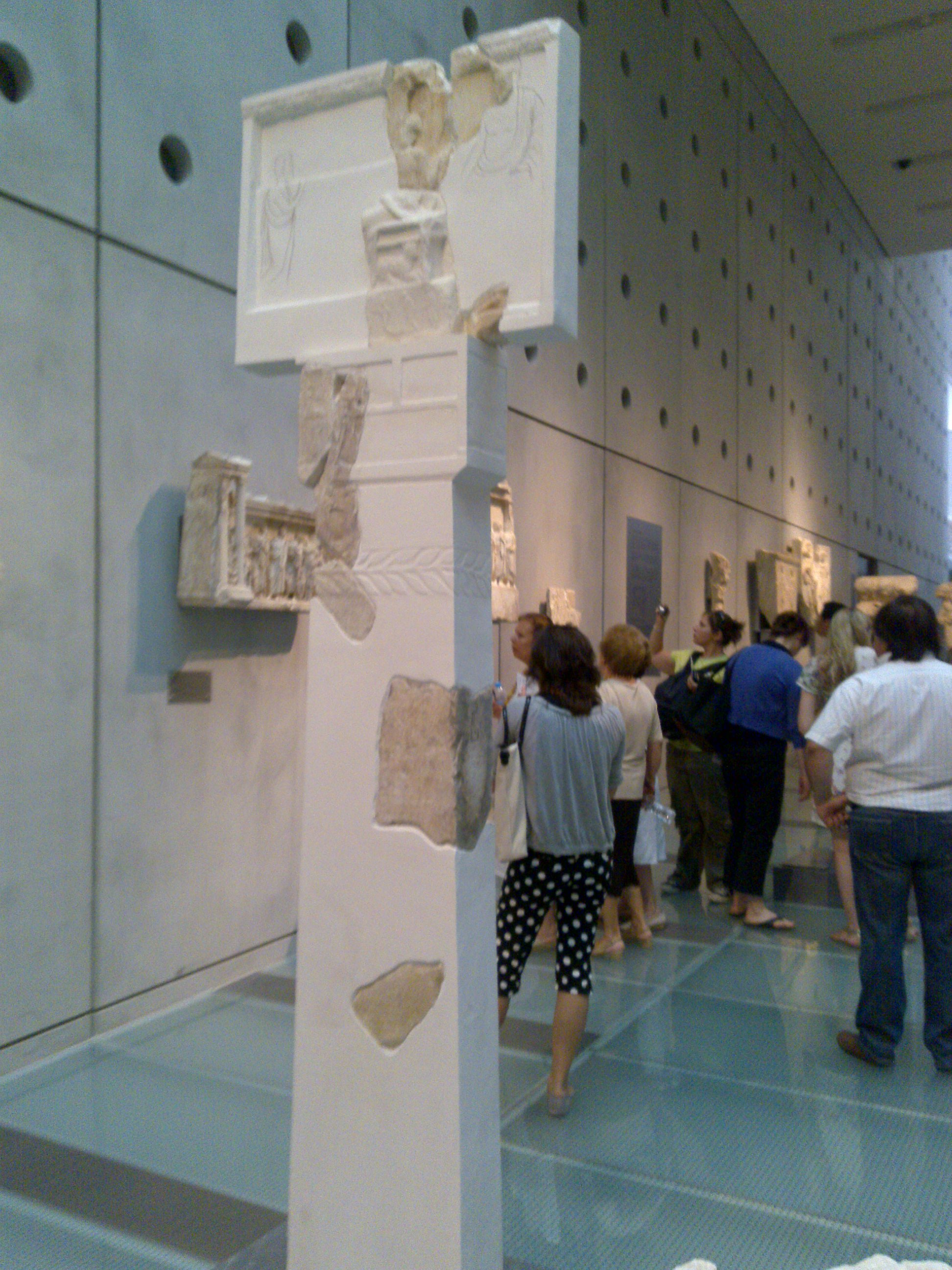
Telemachos Monument, Akropolis Museum, ΕΑΜ 2490.

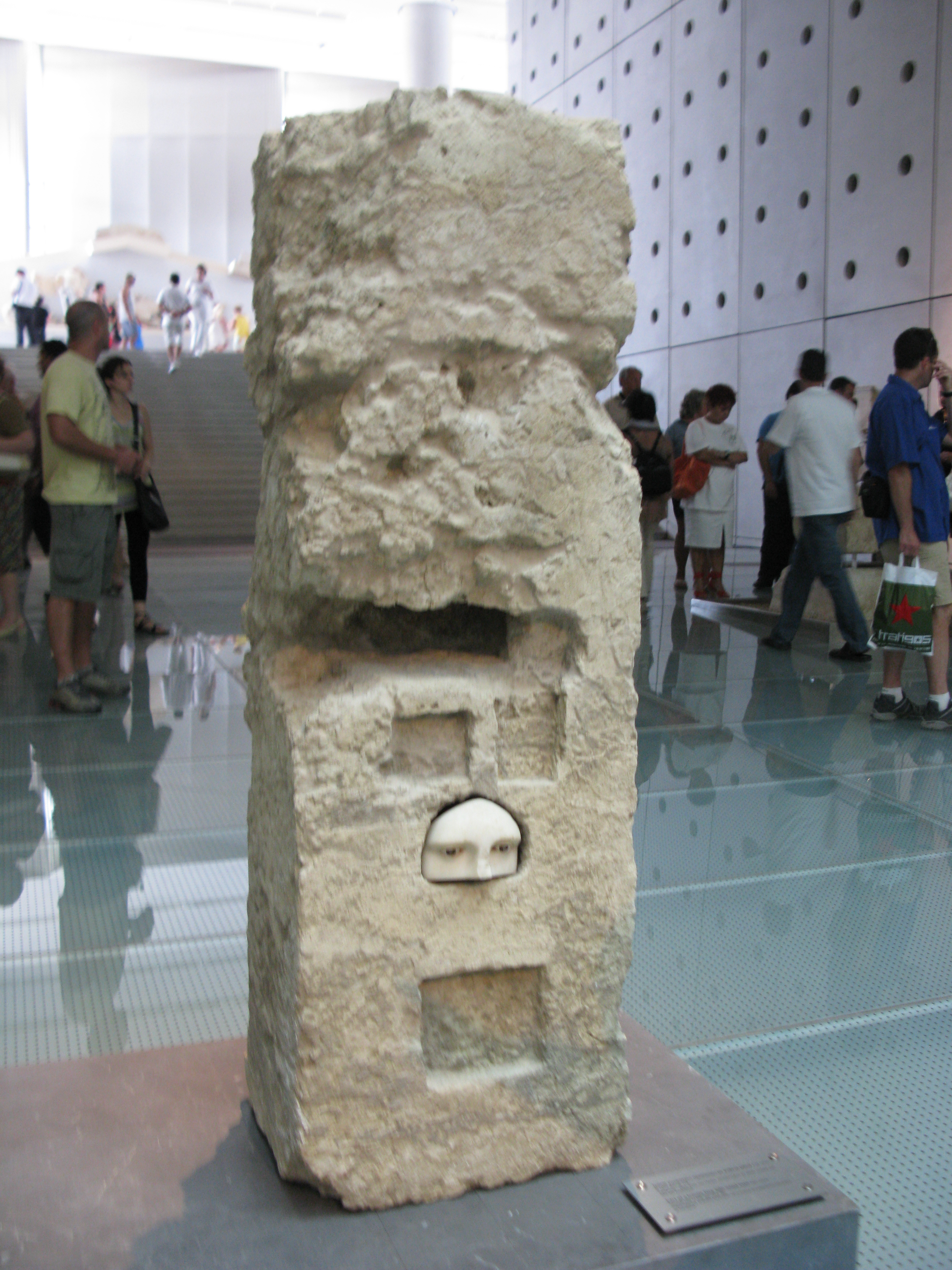
Eye votive from the Asklepieion, the dedication of Praxias, c350-300 BCE, ΕΑΜ 15244

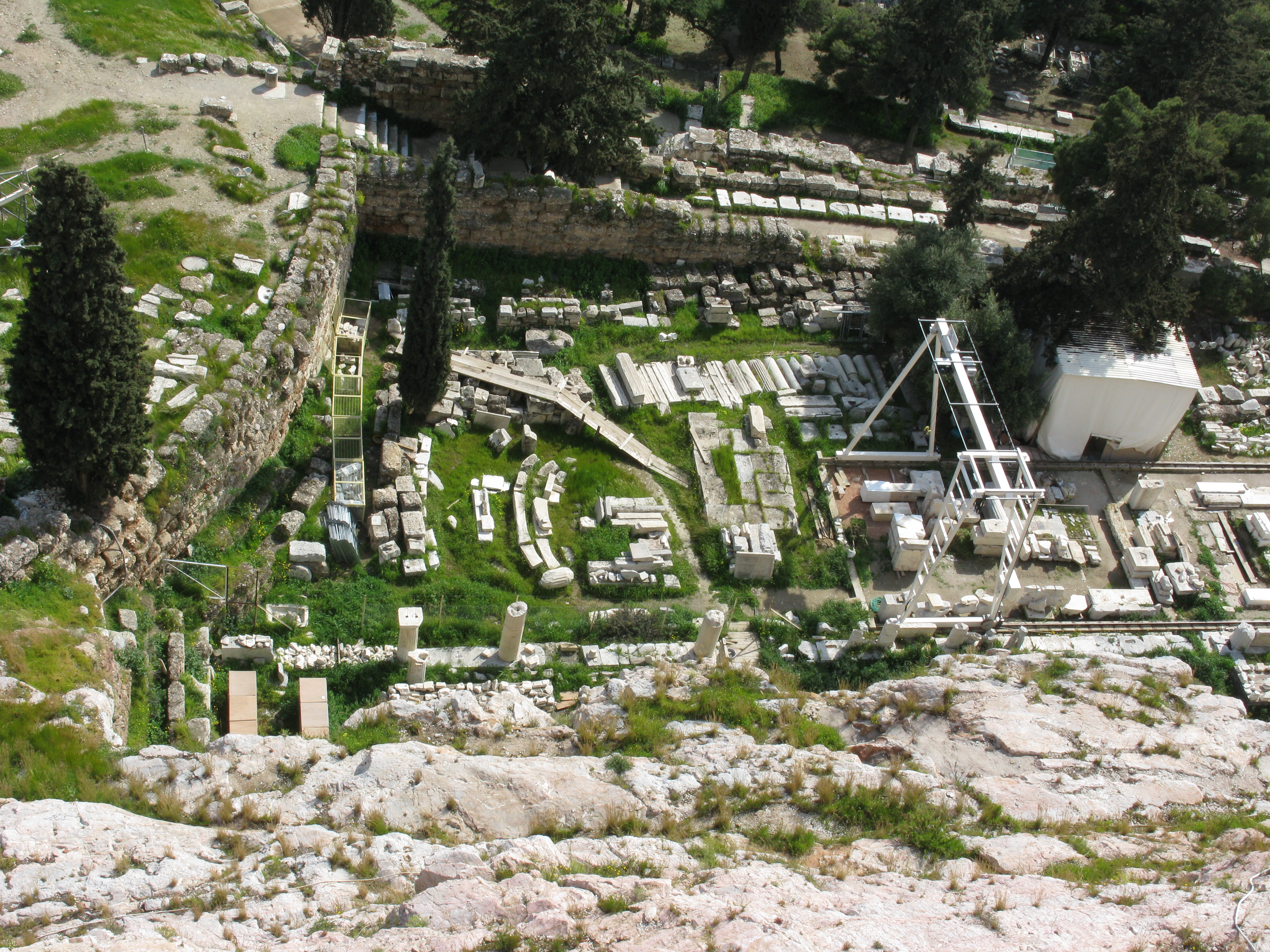
Site of the Asklepieion

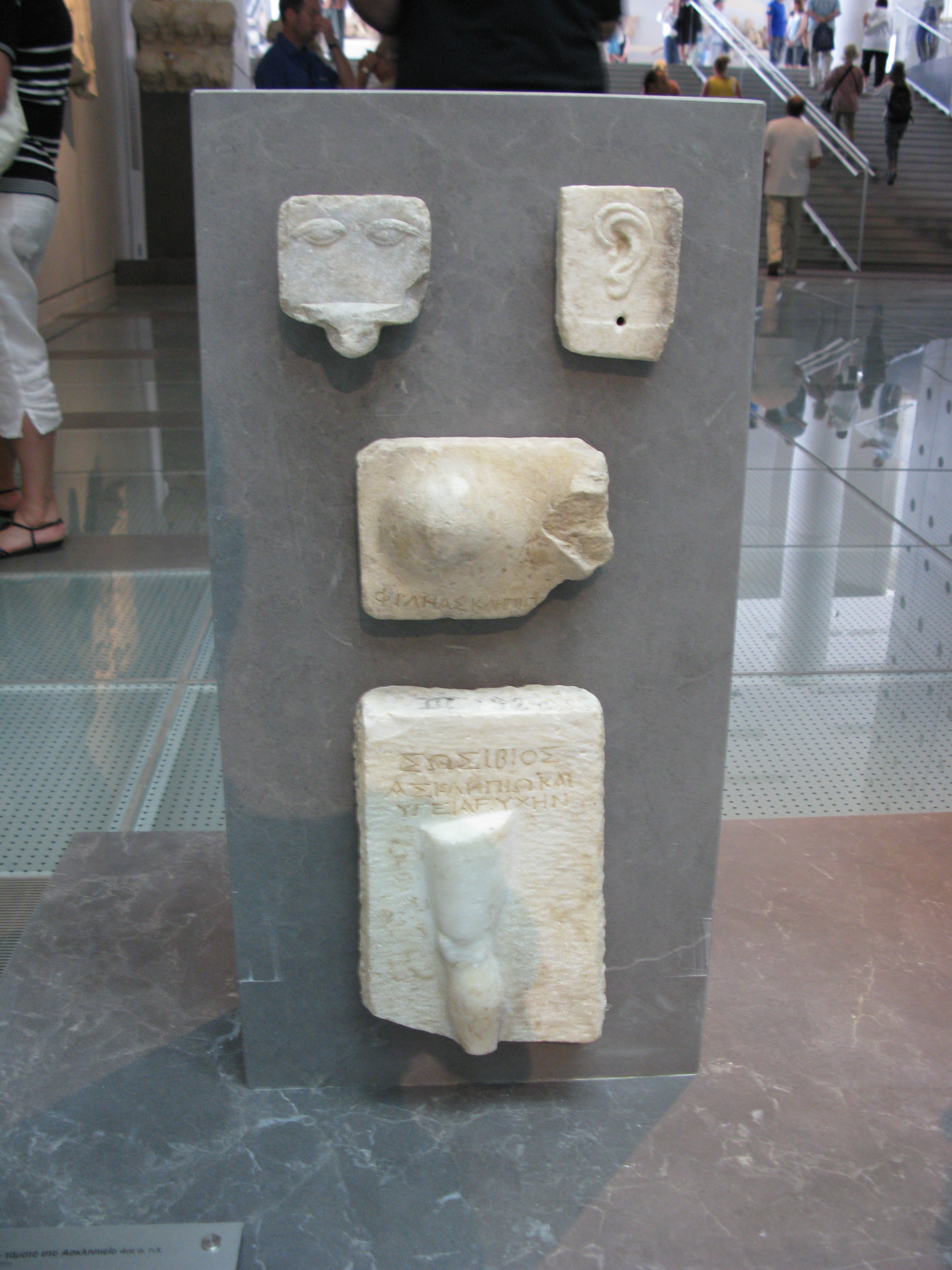
Body part votives. Eyes NAM 2277, Breast EM 8761, Ear Akr 18381, Leg NAM 2571.

== List of priests ==
Between the mid-fourth century BC and the age of Augustus, the priests of Asclepius were chosen by lot each year, in a set cycle based on the Athenian tribes. This cycle makes it possible to date many of the priests, making them an important factor for Athenian chronology. In the Roman period, the priests were appointed for life instead.

The following list is based on Sara B. Aleshire, The Athenian Asklepieion (1989), pp. 370-373 and Asklepios at Athens (1991) 75-220, except where otherwise stated.

| Date | Name | Tribe number |
|---|---|---|
| 420- | Telemachus | |
| ca. 350-325 | Ari- | |
| ca. 350-325 | Aristarchus of Cothocidae | 6 |
| ca. 350-325 | Arch- of Coele | 8 |
| ca. 350-325 | Elpines | |
| ca. 350-325 | Thea- | |
| ca. 350-325 | Menestratus of Angele | 3 |
| ca. 350-325 | Nicodemus | |
| ca. 350-325 | -us | |
| ca. 350-300 | -stratus of Angele | 3 |
| ca. 350-300 | Amphitecton of Prospalta | 5 or 7 |
| ca. 350-300 | Theophanes of Ach- | 6 or 8 |
| ca. 350-300 | Theophilus | |
| ca. 350-300 | Melanopus of Cholargus | 5 |
| ca. 350-300 | -us of Phalerum | 9 |
| ca. 350-300 | -sius | |
| ca. 350-300 | ... of Sphettus | 5 or 7 |
| ca. 350-300 | Timon | |
| ca. 350-300 | Philocles of Xypete | 7 or 2 |
| Before 343/2 | Theogenes | |
| Before 343/2 | Lysitheus of Tricorynthus | 9 |
| Before 343/2 | -mus | |
| Before 343/2 | -us | |
| Before 343/2 | Pataecus | |
| 341/0 | Eunicides of Halae | 2 |
| 340/39 | Diocles of Myrrhinous | 3 |
| 339/8 | Polyxenus | 4 |
| 338/7 | Teisias | 5 |
| 336/5 | Telesias | 7 |
| Before 329/8 | Te- | |
| 332/1 | Philippus | 1 |
| 331/0 | P- | 2 |
| 330/29 | Demon of Pania | 3 |
| 329/8 | P---s of Cettus | 4 |
| 328/7 | Androcles of Cerameis | 5 |
| ca. 320 | Leucon of Phrearrhi | 4 |
| ca. 325-275 | Nicostratus of Aphidna | 9 or 11 |
| Late 4th century | Olympichus of Cydathenaeum | 3 or 1 |
| Late 4th century | Phanostratus of Erchia | 4 |
| 4th/3rd century | Archippus | |
| 4th/3rd century | -menes of Angele | 5 |
| Early 3rd century | Aeschronides | 1 or 9 |
| Early 3rd century | Euthydemus of Oeum | 2 or 10 |
| Early 3rd century | Philius of Phalerum | 11 |
| Early 3rd century | Niconides of Phlya | 9 |
| 284/3 | Phyleus of Eleusis | 10 |
| 280/79 | Onetor of Melite | 2 |
| 277/6 | Philochares of Oa | 5 |
| 276/5 | A- | |
| 275/4 | Philippus | |
| Before 274/3 | An- | |
| Before 274/3 | Archestratus | |
| Before 274/3 | Diopeithes | |
| Before 274/3 | Epicrates | |
| Before 274/3 | Eudidactus | |
| Before 274/3 | Eumnestus | |
| Before 274/3 | Theo- | |
| Before 274/3 | Thrasyboulus | |
| Before 274/3 | Ctesicles of Hagnus | 2 or 5 |
| Before 274/3 | M- | |
| Before 274/3 | -machus | |
| Before 274/3 | Phaedrippus | |
| Before 274/3 | Phanomachus | |
| Before 274/3 | Philoctemon | |
| Before 274/3 | Charinus | |
| 266/5 | Demagenes | 4 |
| Before 260/59 | Archicles of Laciadae | 8 |
| Before 260/59 | Lycomedes of Conthyle | 7 |
| Before 260/59 | Lysanias of Probalinthus | 7 |
| Before 260/59 | Nicomachus | |
| Before 260/59 | Xenocritus of Aphidna | 11 |
| Before 260/59 | -sides of Alopece | 12 |
| Before 260/59 | ... of Sounium | 6 |
| 260/59 or earlier | Pe- | |
| 259/8 or earlier | Amein- | 7 |
| 258/7 or earlier | Timocles of Epicephisia | 8 |
| 257/6 or earlier | Lysicles of Sypalettus | 9 |
| 256/5 or earlier | Procles of Piraeus | 10 |
| 255/4 or earlier | Lyceas of Rhamnus | 11 |
| 254/3 or earlier | Phileas of Eitea | 12 |
| 254/3 or earlier | Calliades of Aegilia | 12 |
| 253/2 or earlier | Thexenus of Pergase | 1 |
| 252/1 or earlier | Theodorus of Melite | 2 |
| 251/0 or earlier | ... Euonymum | 3 |
| 250/49 or earlier | Philippus of Ionidae | 4 |
| 249/8 or earlier | Autocles of Oa | 5 |
| 248/7 or earlier | Philocrates of Hecale | 6 |
| 247/6 or earlier | Praxiteles of Eiresidae | 7 |
| 246/5 or earlier | Ctesonides | 8 |
| 245/4 or earlier | Boescus of Phlya | 9 |
| 240/39 or later | ... of Xypete | 2 |
| 215/4 | Eustratus of Oinoe | 7 or 12 |
| 3rd century BC | Simylus of Coele | 2 or 10 or 11 |
| ca. 200 BC | Calchas of Hamaxanteia | 10 or 11 |
| 190-170 | Ammonius of Pambotadae | 1 |
| 165/4 | Protagoras of Pergase | 1 |
| ca. 150 | Me- | |
| 138/7 | ... of Phlya | 7 |
| ca. 120-110 | Zenon of Melite | 8 |
| 109/8 | Nicodorus of Cephisia | 1 |
| After 109/8 | Embius of Prospalta | 7 |
| 2nd century BC | Gorgus | |
| Late 2nd century BC | Leonides of Phlya | 7 |
| c. 100 BC | ... of Cholleidae | 4 |
| 75/4 | Menandrus of Cephisia | 1 |
| After 75/4 | Ameipsias of Potamus | 4 |
| 62/1 | Socrates of Cephisia | 1 |
| 51/0 | Theodorus of Myrrhinoutta | 2 |
| ca. 26/5 | Diocles of Kephisia | 7 |
| ca. 50-10 BC | Theodorus of Hestiaea | 9 |
| ca. 25 BC-9 AD | Theophilus of Eleusis | 9 |
| 9/8 BC-13/4 AD | Zenon of Rhamnus | |
| 1st century BC | ... of Cephisia | 1 |
| Late 1st century BC | Asopodorus of Phlya | |
| 1st century BC or AD | -on son of Lysi- | |
| 85/6-94/5 AD | Gaius Casius ... of Collytus | |
| 1st century AD | Pericles of Paiania | |
| ca. 190-200 | ... of Apollonieis | |
| ca.200 AD | Publius Aelius Dionysodorus of Acharnae | |
| ca. 200 AD | Flavius Onesicrates of Diomeia | |
| 235-260 AD | Quintus Statius Glaucus of Cholleidae | |
| 3rd century AD | Nicostratus | |
| ca. 304 AD | Marcus Junius Nicagoras | |
| ca. 400 AD | Plutarch of Athens? | |

== Bibliography ==
- Travlos, J. (1980). Pictorial Dictionary of Ancient Athens.
- Aleshire, Sara B. (1989). The Athenian Asklepieion: the people, their dedications, and the inventories. Amsterdam: J.C. Gieben.
- Aleshire, Sara B. (1991). Asklepios at Athens : epigraphic and prosopographic essays on the Athenian healing cults. Amsterdam: J.C. Gieben. ISBN 9789050630689.
- Camp, J. M. (2001). Archaeology of Athens.
- Melfi, Milena (2007). I santuari di Asclepio in Grecia. Roma: L'Erma di Bretschneider. pp. 313–432. ISBN 9788882653477.
- Mitchell-Boyask, Robin (2007). Plague and the Athenian Imagination: Drama, History, and the Cult of Asclepius. Cambridge.
- Papaeuthymiou, V. (2009). "Recent excavations at the Asklepieion of Athens". In De Miro, E.; Sfameni Gasparro, G.; Calì, V. (eds.). Il culto di Asclepio nell’area mediterranea. Atti del convegno internazionale, Agrigento 20–22 novembre 2005. Rome. pp. 79–89.
