= Sara B. Aleshire =

Sara B. Aleshire (22 May 1947 – 2 May 1997) was an American epigrapher and historian of ancient Greek religion, best known for her work on the Asclepieion of Athens, Athenian religious inscriptions, and Athenian prosopography.

== Life ==
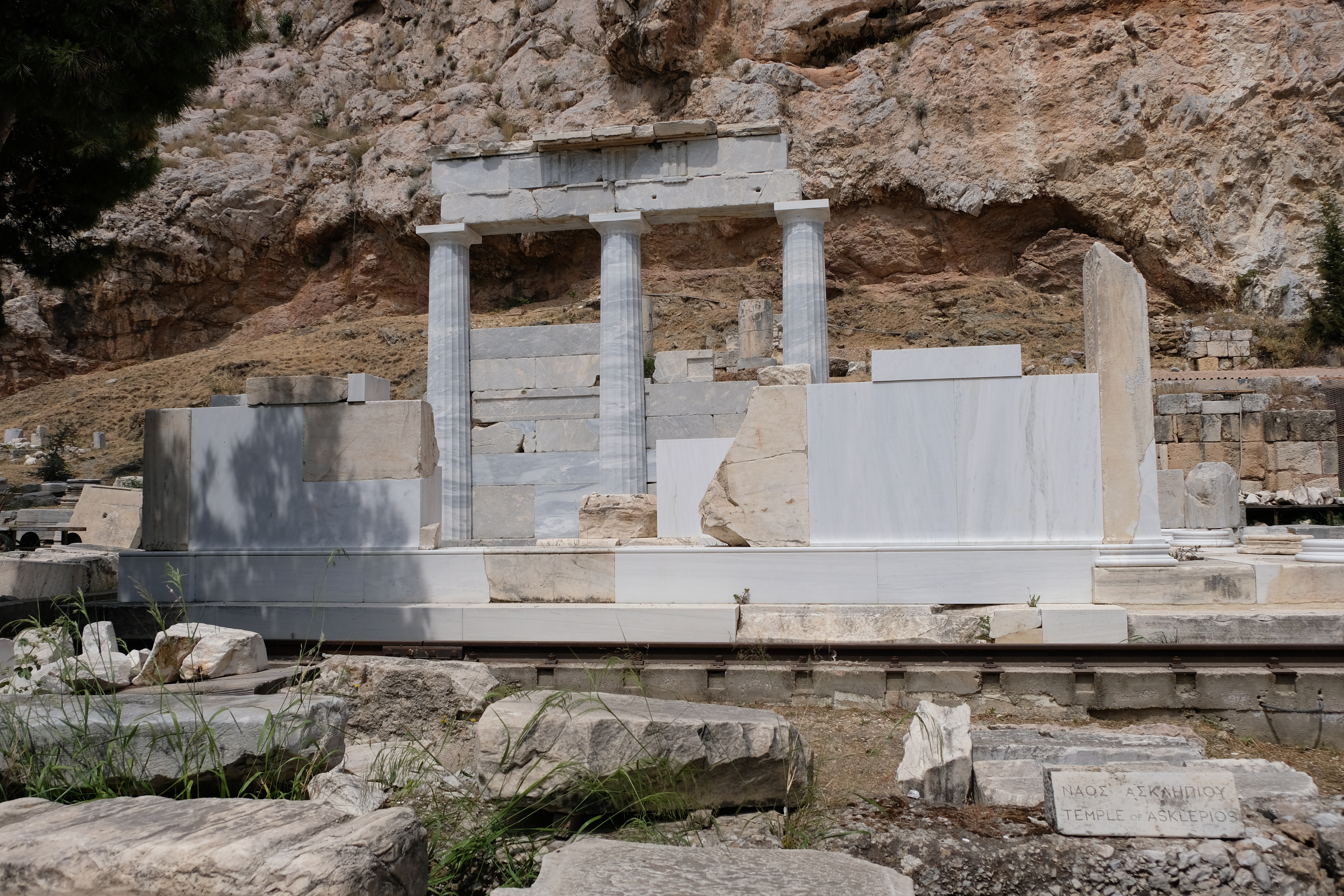
The Asclepieion of Athens, topic of Aleshire's 1989 and 1991 monographs.

Aleshire was born Sara Ellen Bavousett in Lubbock, Texas, where she achieved a BA in Classics at Texas Tech University in 1970, co-authoring her first book during her undergraduate studies. She continued her studies at the University of California, Berkeley with an MA in Linguistics in 1974 and a PhD in Ancient History and Mediterranean Archaeology in 1986. She was a teaching assistant at Berkeley from 1971 to 1973 and a research assistant there in classics and linguistics from 1974 to 1978. After her graduation, she was a permanent research fellow of Berkeley and also a frequent Senior Associate Member of the American School of Classical Studies at Athens. In 1976, Aleshire played a leading role in reviving the Supplementum Epigraphicum Graecum, which had ceased publishing with volume 25 in 1971. She served as the journal's assistant editor and was responsible for the sections dealing with inscriptions of Attica and the Peloponnese until her death in 1997. She was a Fellow in the School of Historical Studies at the Institute for Advanced Study in Princeton from 1992 to 1993, and Watkins Fellow at the Center for Epigraphical and Palaeographical Studies at Ohio State University in 1996. Aleshire was also editor of Gieben's monograph series ΑΡΧΑΙΑ ΕΛΛΑΣ: Monographs on Ancient Greek History and Archaeology.

She published her PhD thesis as The Athenian Asklepieion: The People, Their Dedications, and the Inventories in 1989, with a companion work, Asklepios at Athens: Epigraphic and Prosopographic Essays on the Athenian Healing Cults in 1991. These works:

broke new ground in the study of one of the most popular sanctuaries in Athens and in the operation of healing cults in ancient Greece... sparked new research into the topography of the southern slope of the Athenian Acropolis and provided a model for the detailed examination of inscribed sacred inventories elsewhere

— Ronald S. Stroud

Her work on the role of "archaism" in Athenian religion in the time of Augustus, largely published posthumously, has formed the basis for understandings of the role of tradition and the past in Athenian culture in the Roman period.

Aleshire died suddenly of a heart attack in Athens in 1997. Volume 44 of the Supplementum Epigraphicum Graecum was dedicated to her memory. Aleshire left her collection of epigraphic squeezes, her personal library, and an endowment to Berkeley, where they formed the basis of the "Sara B. Aleshire Center for the Study of Greek Epigraphy," established in 1998.

== Bibliography ==
- Bodoh, John J.; Bavousett, Sara Ellen (1970). An index of Greek verb forms (in German). G. Olms.
- Aleshire, Sara B. (1989). The Athenian Asklepieion : the people, their dedications, and the inventories. Amsterdam: J.C. Gieben. ISBN 978-90-5063-025-2.
- Aleshire, Sara B. (1991). Asklepios at Athens : epigraphic and prosopographic essays on the Athenian healing cults. Amsterdam: J.C. Gieben. ISBN 9789050630689.
- Aleshire, Sara B. (1994). "Towards a Definition of 'State Cult' for Ancient Athens". In Hägg, Robin (ed.). Ancient Greek cult practice from the archaeological evidence : proceedings of the Second International Seminar on Ancient Greek Cult, organized by the Swedish Institute at Athens, 22-24 November 1991. Stockholm: Svenska Institutet i Athen. pp. 9–16. ISBN 9179160360.
- Aleshire, Sara B. (1994). "The Demos and the Priests: The Selection of Sacred Officials at Athens from Cleisthenes to Augustus". In Osborne, Robin; Hornblower, Simon (eds.). Ritual, Finance, Politics: Athenian Democratic Accounts Presented to David Lewis. Oxford: Clarendon Press. pp. 325–337. ISBN 978-0-19-814992-7.
- Aleshire, Sara B. (1999). "The Identification of Archaizing Inscriptions from Roman Attica". XI congresso internazionale di epigrafia greca e latina : Roma, 18-24 settembre 1997 : atti. Roma: Edizioni Quasar. pp. 153–161. ISBN 88-7140-152-2.
- Aleshire, Sara B.; Lambert, Stephen D. (2003). "Making the Peplos for Athena: A New Edition of IG II² 1060 + IG II² 1036". Zeitschrift für Papyrologie und Epigraphik. 142: 65–86. ISSN 0084-5388. JSTOR 20191578.
- Aleshire, Sara B. (2011). "The Attic gene and the Athenian Religious Reform of 21 BC". In Richardson, James H.; Santangelo, Federico (eds.). Priests and state in the Roman world. Stuttgart. ISBN 9783515098175.
