= Asclepieion =

Healing temples located in ancient Greece

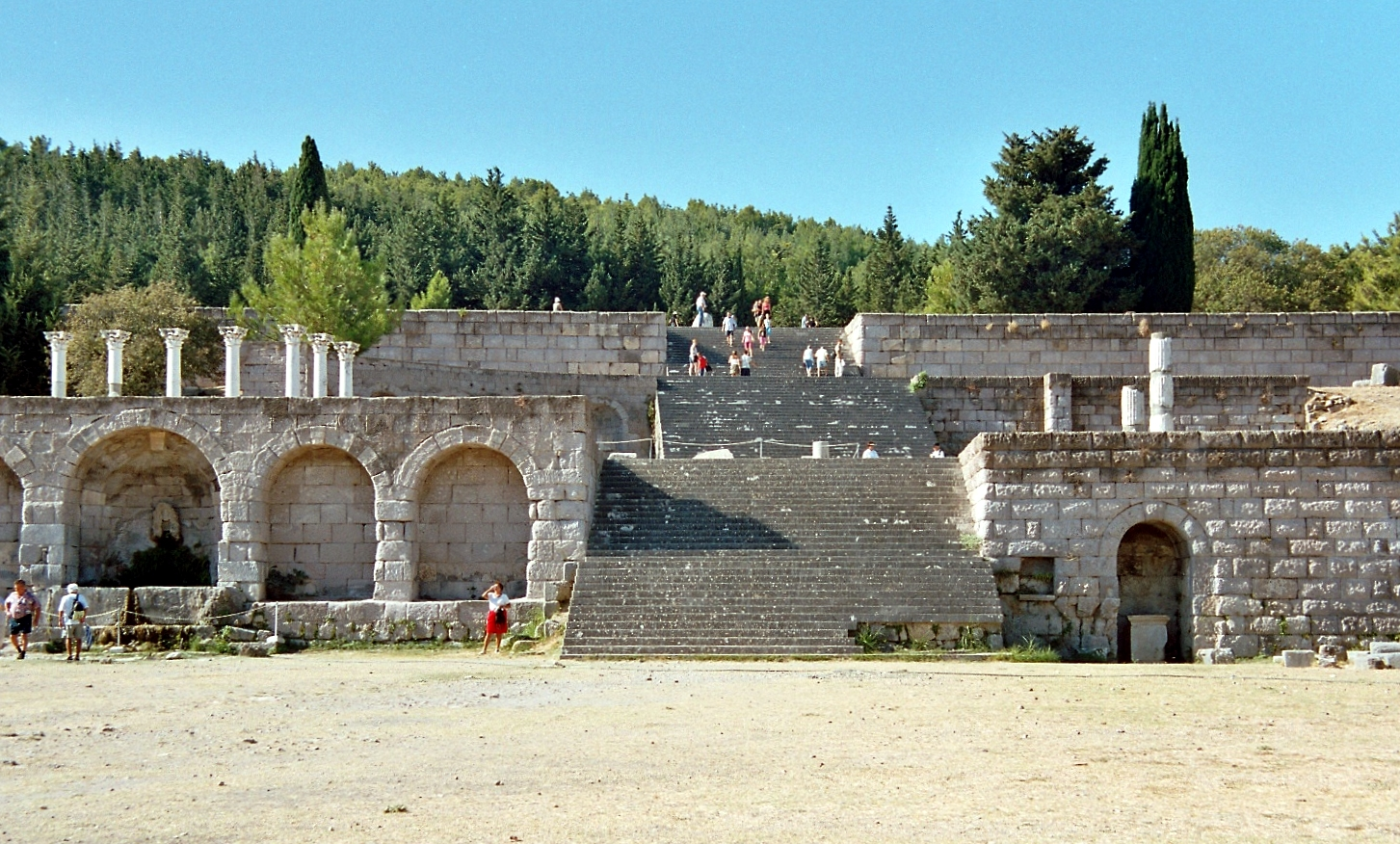
The Asklepieion on Kos

An Asclepieion (Ancient Greek: Ἀσκληπιεῖον Asklepieion; Ἀσκλαπιεῖον in Doric dialect; Latin aesculapīum), plural Asclepieia, was a healing temple in ancient Greece (and in the wider Hellenistic and Roman world) that was dedicated to Asclepius, the first doctor-demigod in Greek mythology. Asclepius was said to have been such a skilled doctor that he could even raise people from the dead. Stemming from the myth of his great healing powers, pilgrims would flock to temples built in his honor in order to seek spiritual and physical healing.

Asclepieia included carefully controlled spaces conducive to healing and fulfilled several of the requirements of institutions created for healing. Treatment at these temples largely centered around promoting healthy lifestyles, with a particular emphasis on a person's spiritual needs. Characteristic of the Asclepieion was the practice of incubatio, also known as 'temple sleep.' This was a process by which patients would go to sleep in the temple with the expectation that they would be visited by Asclepius himself or one of his healing children in their dream. During this time, they would be told what it is that they needed to do in order to cure their ailment. At the very least, they would wake up having not been directly visited by a deity and instead report their dream to a priest. The priest would then interpret the dream and prescribe a cure, often a visit to the baths or a gymnasium. The preliminary treatment for admission into the Asclepieia was catharsis, or purification. It consisted of a series of cleansing baths and purgations, accompanied by a cleansing diet, which lasted several days.

In the Asclepieion of Epidaurus, three large marble boards dated to 350 BC preserve the names, case histories, complaints, and cures of about 70 patients who came to the temple with a problem and shed it there. Some of the surgical cures listed, such as the opening of an abdominal abscess or the removal of traumatic foreign material, are realistic enough to have taken place, with the patient in a dream-like state of induced sleep known as "enkoimesis" (Greek: ἐγκοίμησις), not unlike anesthesia, induced with the help of soporific substances such as opium.

Asclepieia also became home to future physicians as well. Hippocrates is said to have received his medical training at an asclepieion on the isle of Kos. Prior to becoming the personal physician to the Roman Emperor Marcus Aurelius, Galen treated and studied at the famed asclepieion at Pergamon.

== Asclepius and his cult ==
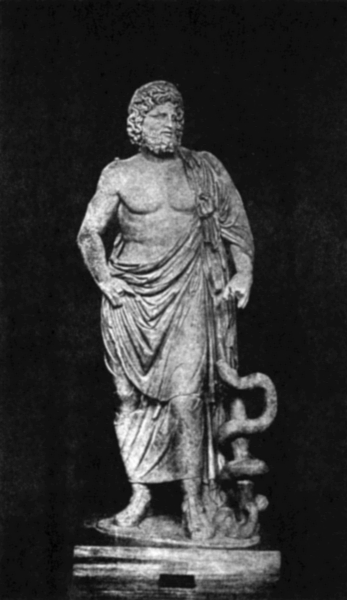
Asclepius holding the staff with a snake wrapped around it that serves as the inspiration for the symbol of medicine.

In Greek mythology and religion, Asclepius was the god of medicine – son of the god Apollo and mortal Coronis. His name was said to mean "cut open". It is said that he was so named as a result of his mother's childbirth experience, during which time her womb had to be cut open in order for Asclepius to be born (now known as a cesarean section). In Homer's Iliad, Asclepius was a man, a physician to soldiers wounded on the battlefield at Troy. But by Hippocrates' day, he had become elevated to the status of a god.

Asclepius’ father Apollo was himself a patron god of medicine. It was through Apollo that Chiron, the wise and peaceful centaur, learned the art of healing. Under Apollo's mentorship, Chiron grew in his craft so much so that Apollo himself entrusted Chiron to train his son, Asclepius. Through his studies, Asclepius became so deft at medicine, especially the art of surgery, that he was able to return the living from the dead. His abilities quickly drew attention and jealousy from the other gods. As one story goes, Asclepius was killed by Zeus at the request of Hades, the god of the underworld, who feared Asclepius was stealing souls away from him. Before his death, however, Asclepius had several children, including: Machaon, Podalirius, Hygeia, and Panacea, who themselves were regarded as highly effective healers.

Starting around 350 BC, the cult of Asclepius became increasingly popular. He was admired for serving people despite their class and social status, which was not a common practice by Olympians. Doctors claiming to be the direct descendants of Asclepius referred to themselves as “Asclepiads.” The symbol of a snake wrapped around a staff, which is widely used by modern medical institutions, such as the American Medical Association, is modelled on the staff that Asclepius carried.

== Asclepieia temples ==
Over 300 asclepieia have been discovered throughout ancient Greece. Among the most famous of the temples were Trikka, Epidaurus, island of Kos, Athens, Corinth and Pergamon. These temples were often located in secluded locations surrounded modern spas or mountain sanatoriums. These sanctuaries could attract diverse audiences for various needs other than healing, which makes these spaces more complex than merely healing spaces.

Also characteristic of these temples were the presence of dogs and nonvenomous snakes, known as Aesculapian snake, who would frequent the halls and dormitories and who played an important role in healing activities.

Asclepius may first have been worshipped as a hero in Trikka (modern Trikala), Thessaly, Greece. Ancient mythographers generally regarded Trikka as the place of Asclepius' birth, but to date archaeological excavations have yet to uncover his sanctuary there. Epidaurus, on the other hand, was the first place to worship Asclepius as a god, beginning sometime in the 5th century BC. The asclepieion at Epidaurus is both extensive and well preserved. There is also an asclepieion located on the south slopes of the Acropolis of Athens which dates to around 420 BC.

Located on the Argolid plain of the east Peloponnese in Greece, Epidaurus was the main asclepieion. The healing temple was named after Asclepius, the son of Apollo. At the Epidaurus, there were various people such as physicians and priests who would assist those who sought a session of healing from these professionals. Patients would come pay homage to the gods by making pilgrimages to the site, performing a prayer or a sacrifice, giving monetary gifts or even sleep at the temple. The Epidaurus also served as a sanctuary for those who were extremely ill. It was eventually expanded to a one hundred eighty-room institution to house the dying and women in labour during the Roman Empire.

== Procedures performed at asclepieia ==
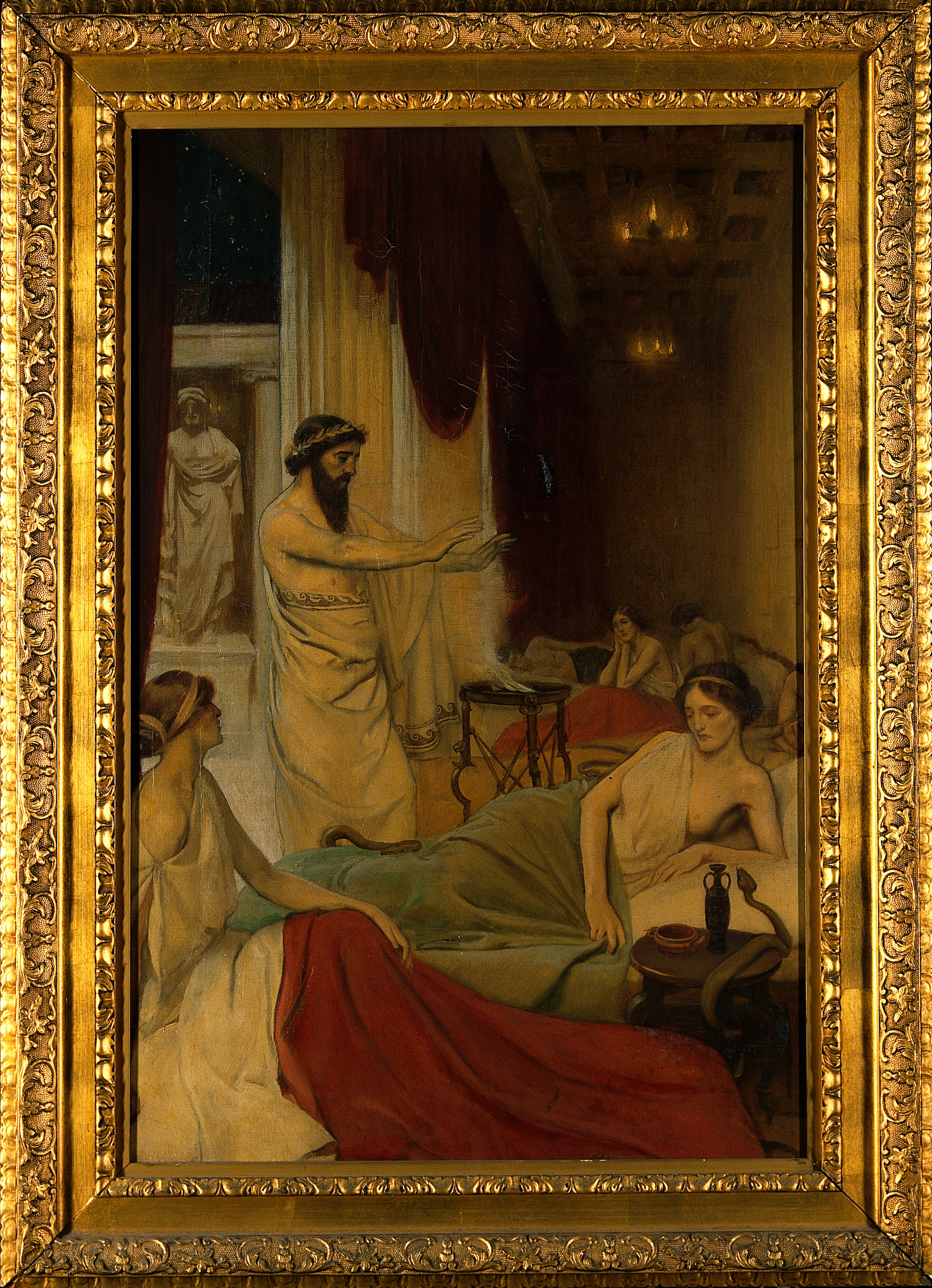
Patients sleeping in the temple of Aesculapius at Epidaurus by Ernest Board

Signature to asclepian medicine was its holistic approach to patient care. It emphasized therapy through the natural environment, hence the carefully chosen locations, as well as care for the patient's psychological and emotional states. By attending to these things, the patient's innate healing mechanisms were activated, which promoted recovery.

There were two steps in order for a patient to be considered to be treated in the asclepieion. The first of which is the Katharsis or purification stage. This is when a patient undergoes a series of baths and other methods of purging, such as a clean diet over a series of several days or purging their emotions through art. The patient would then make an offering such as money or a prayer to the temple, therefore to Asclepius. The priest of the temple then gives the patient a prayer in which it would ease the patient's mind and create a more positive outlook for them.

Afterwards, comes incubation or dream therapy. Patients would sleep in the “Abaton” or “Enkoimeterion,” which was a dormitory located in the asclepieion. Here, they would be lulled into a hypnotic state, and begin their dream journey. As they slept, they were visited by Asclepius or his daughters Hygeia and Panacea. These dream visitations were prognostic in nature, revealing the projected course of the disease and ultimate patient outcomes. During this time, patients would also discover what it was they needed to do once they woke in order to treat their disease. Upon awakening, the patient would recount their dream to a temple priest, who would then prescribe a treatment based on their interpretation. Other dreams were less direct, and more symbolic. The physician - priests at the Asclepions were also master dream interpreters who would divine the treatment to be followed from the patient's account of the dream. The god Asclepius had certain totem animals in whose guise he liked to visit the supplicants as they slept. These were the dog, the rooster, and of course, the snake.

== List of Asclepieia ==
- Asclepieion at Epidaurus
- Asclepieion at Kos
- Asclepieion of Athens on the Acropolis, established 419/18 BC
- Asclepieion of Athens in Piraeus
- Asclepieion at Pergamum, established early in the third century BC
- Temple of Asclepius on Tiber Island in Rome, dedicated in 289 BC
- Asclepieion at Messene, established in the third century BC

== See also ==
- Ancient Greek medicine
- Pool of Bethesda
- Temple of Eshmun
