= Asclepieion of Pergamon =

Ancient Greek temple complex

Coordinates: 39°07′08″N 27°09′50″E

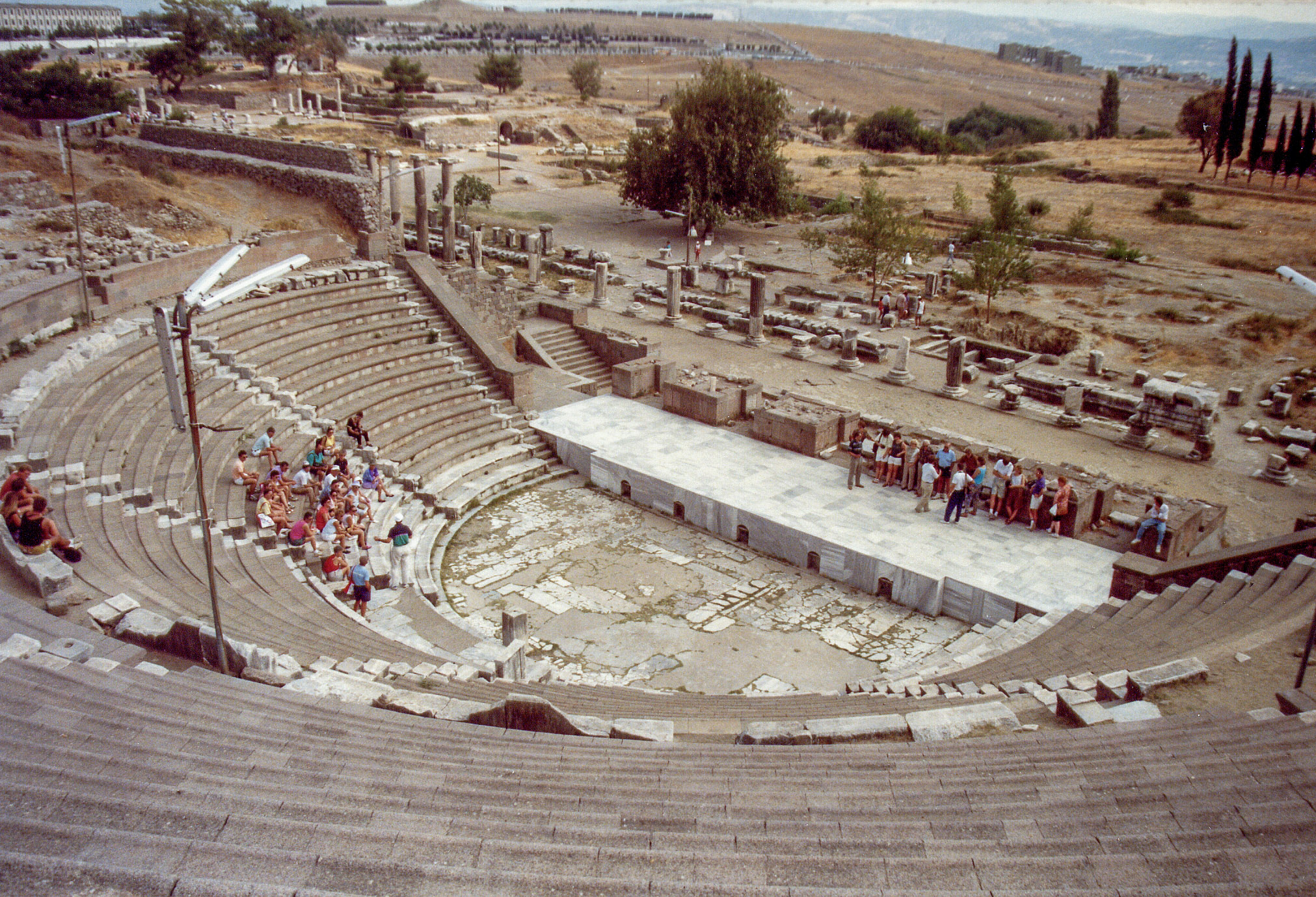
Roman theatre at the Asclepieion of Pergamon

The Asclepieion of Pergamon was an asclepieion, a healing temple, built in honour of the gods Asclepius and Hygieia, located west of the Pergamon hill, roughly three kilometers southwest of the acropolis in modern-day Bergama, Turkey. Founded in the mid-4th century BCE, it functioned as a religious and therapeutic centre through the Hellenistic and Roman periods, reaching its greatest prominence in the 2nd Century CE.

== Construction periods ==
The Asclepieion grew across several distinct building phases spanning roughly eight centuries.

The sanctuary's origins date to the mid-4th century BCE, when the complex consisted of a modest sacred enclosure and spring shrine at the site. The legend credits the founding to Archias, a citizen of Pergamon who was said to have been cured at the Asclepieion of Epidaurus and established the cult in his hometown out of gratitude. This early construction remained small.

Under the Attalid dynasty in the 3rd and 2nd centuries BCE, the sanctuary saw its major expansion. During this period, a Doric temple to Hygieia was built, along with a cluster of structures around the incubation area.

By the late Hellenistic and early Roman periods, a third temple was added at the southwest corner, and the sacred way linking the sanctuary to the city was covered with a vault.

Under Hadrian, a decisive change was made in the 2nd century CE. The precinct roughly quadrupled in size, the sacred way was built as a colonnaded street leading to a new propylon, and the north stoa, theatre, and library all date to this phase. The older western cluster of altars, temples, and the incubation area stayed the ritual core of the site even as everything around it was rebuilt.

A major earthquake in 175 CE damaged the colonnades near the library, which were repaired soon after. By the 3rd century CE, the sanctuary was in decline, hit by further earthquake damage and the spread of Christianity.

== Gallery ==
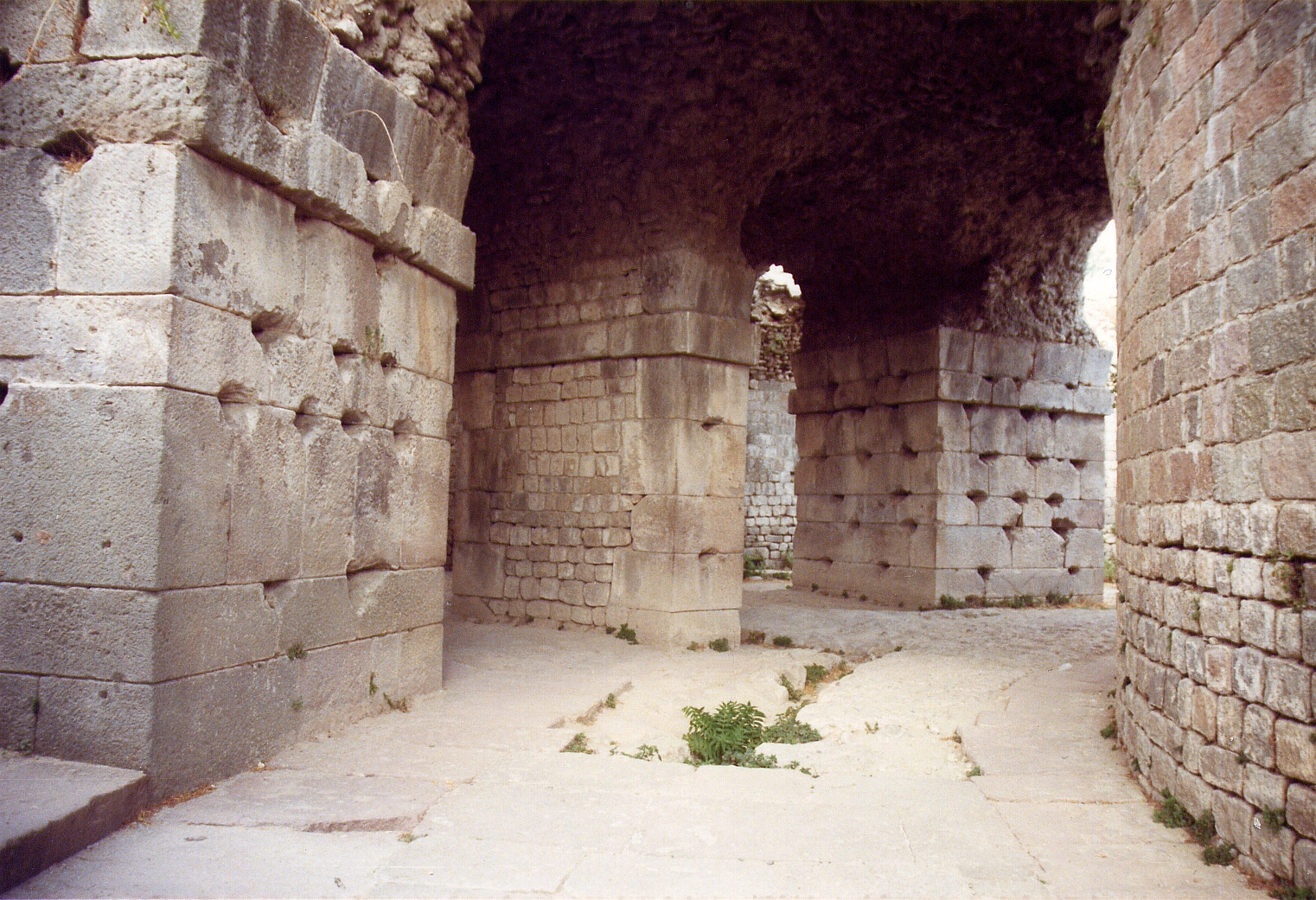
The 70 metre long cryptoporticus, an underground vaulted tunnel in the asclepieion that connected the circular treatment centre to the pools in the centre of the sanctuary courtyard

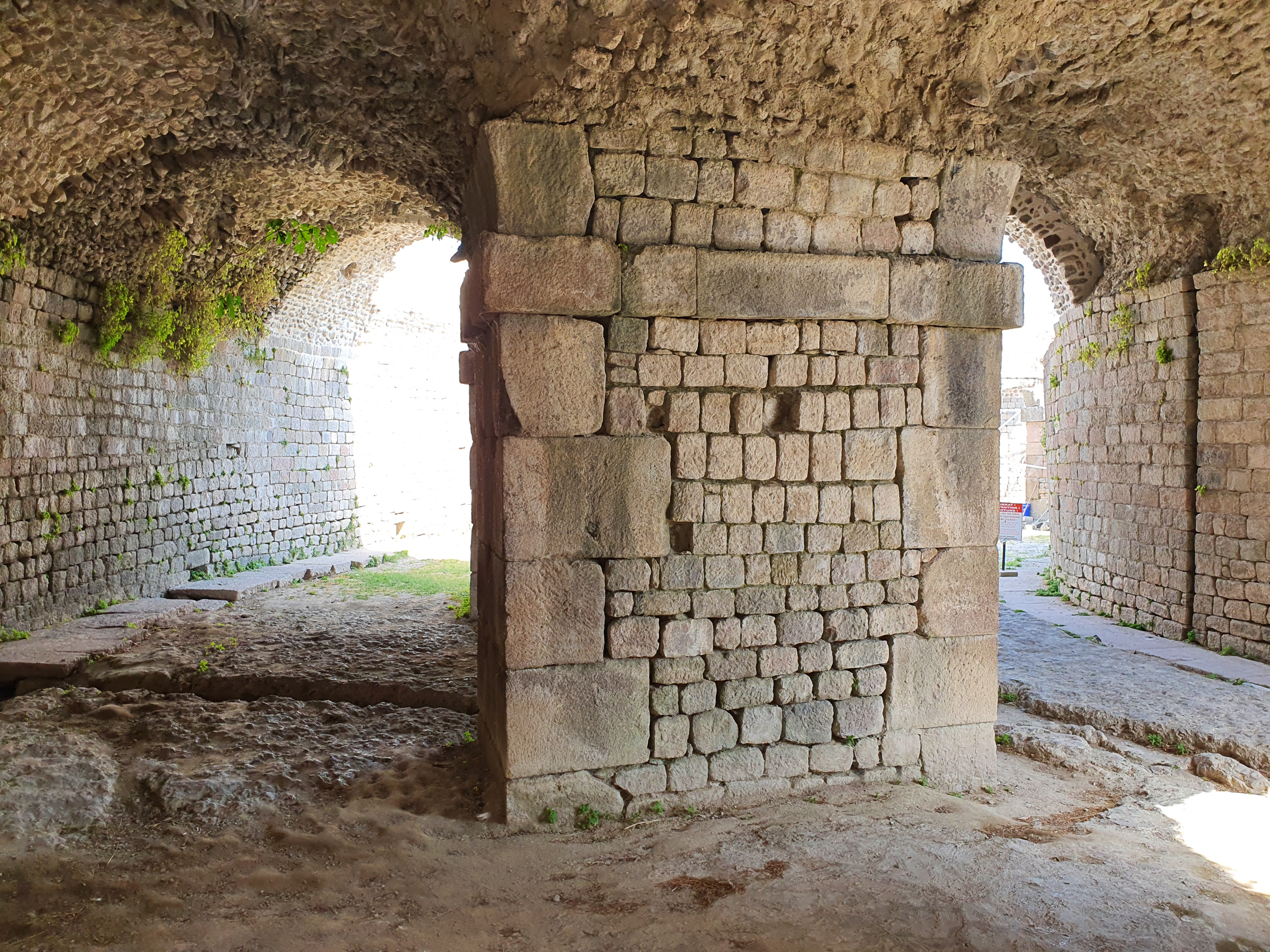
Arched tunnels

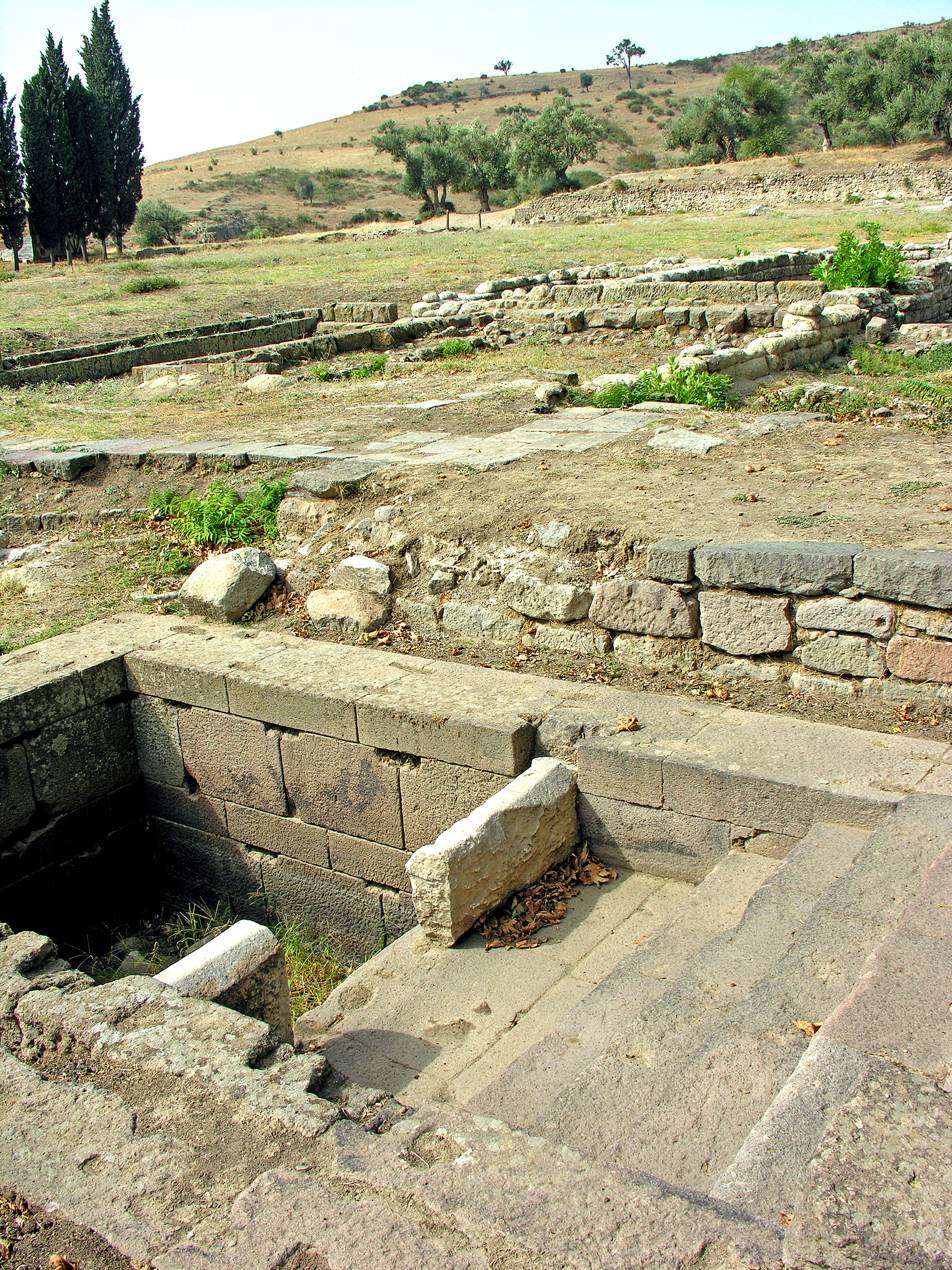
Sacred pools

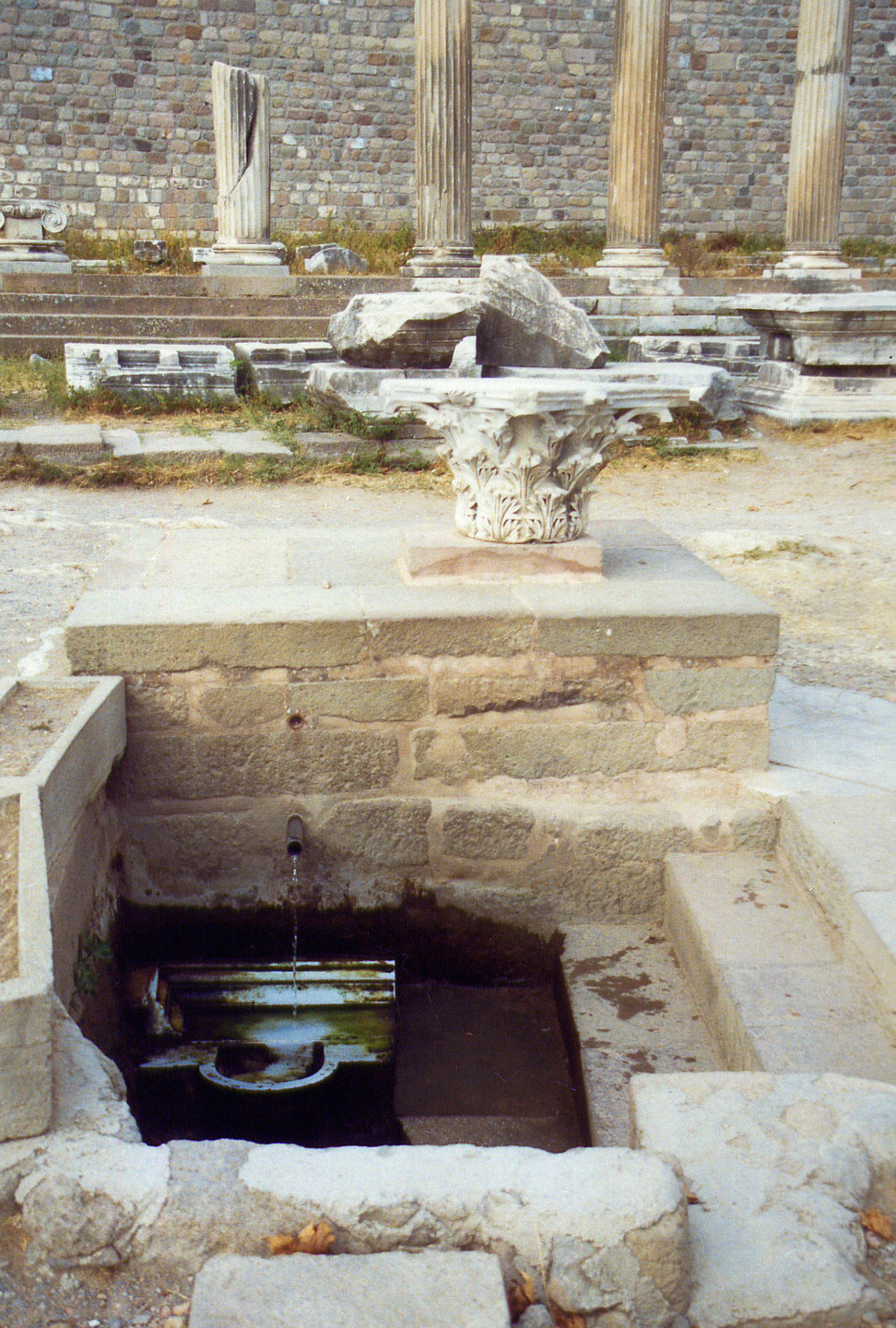
Sacred fountain

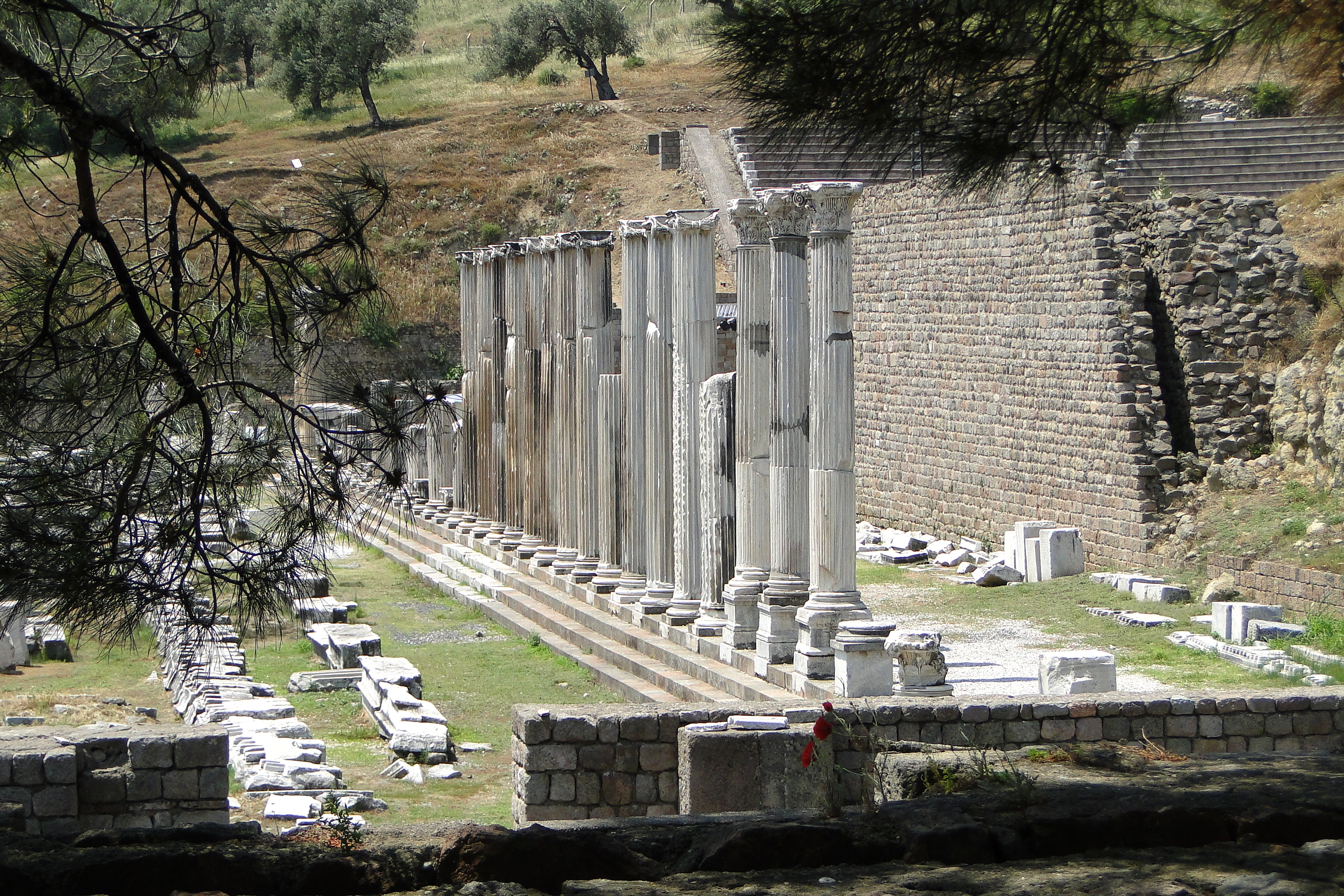
