= Hôpital des Enfants-Trouvés =

Former hospital for abandoned children

Coordinates: 48.853°N 2.371°E

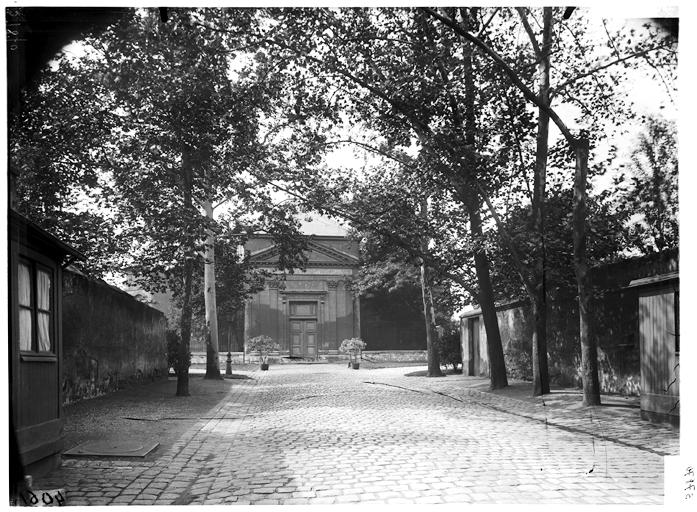
The former hospital

The Hôpital des Enfants-Trouvés was an institution of Paris established to take care of abandoned children. It was founded by Vincent de Paul in 1638.

== History ==
=== Foundation ===
Until the 17th century, there were institutions caring for orphans. In 1363, the hospital of Saint-Esprit-en-Grève was founded, and under Francis I, the Hospice des Enfants-Rouges was established. In 1545, the Hospital of the Trinity was designated for orphans, but it only served children born of legitimate unions.

Abandoned children were instead left to public charity. The bishop and chapter of Notre-Dame reluctantly housed them in a shelter located at Port l'Évêque (serving the Ville l'Évêque, now Port de la Concorde). After 1571, they were moved to houses near Port Saint-Landry.

In 1633, Vincent de Paul founded the Daughters of Charity to help the poor and sick. Significant financial donations from high society funded the institution, and the children were entrusted to the care of the sisters. A second refuge is said to have been created on Rue des Boulangers near the Porte Saint-Victor. In 1645, a group of thirteen houses located in the Champ Saint-Laurent was purchased to house newborns.

In 1647, Anne of Austria granted the sisters the Château de Bicêtre. However, being inconvenient and too far from the center of Paris, it was abandoned in 1651 in favor of a site in the Faubourg Saint-Denis.

A royal edict on 28 June 1670 officially created the Hôpital des Enfants-Trouvés and attached it to the Hôpital Général.

On 24 September 1672, the hospital purchased the Maison de la Marguerite, located on Rue Neuve-Notre-Dame on the Île de la Cité, where assistance to abandoned children was traditionally centered. The house was demolished and replaced by a building with "a chapel below [dedicated to the Holy Childhood of Jesus]..., two square floors above the chapel, with two rooms on each floor." The work was completed in the summer of 1673, and the children were moved in.

In 1674, a property was acquired on Rue du Faubourg-Saint-Antoine to house children over the age of three. For reasons unknown, this site was closed between 1689 and 1698, during which boys and sick children of both sexes were sent to the Salpêtrière, while girls were sent to the Pitié.

The premises on the Île de la Cité quickly became overcrowded, prompting the hospital in 1681 to rent three houses (known as the Croix de Fer, Couronne, and Épée) from the Hôtel-Dieu.

In March 1688, the hospital purchased the Image Saint-Victor from the Abbey of Saint-Victor, partly to expand the chapel. The renovations were carried out in the spring of 1688, and the expanded chapel was blessed on 3 August that year. That same year, the hospital attempted to buy the three rented houses and another, the Chaudron House, but the Hôtel-Dieu refused, fearing it would lose a share of its alms.

This building, known as "La Couche," served as a redistribution center for all abandoned children entrusted to the Parisian administration. It sent unweaned infants to wet nurses and directed older children back to Rue du Faubourg-Saint-Antoine, purchased in 1674. Conditions in these facilities were cramped, unsanitary, and unsuitable, leading to high mortality among newborns.

In 1690, the Hôpital des Enfants-Trouvés merged with the Hôpital des Enfants-Rouges.

== See also ==
- Child abandonment
- Foundling hospital
