= Neonaticide =

Practices of murdering their child during the first day of life

Neonaticide is the deliberate act of a parent murdering their own child during the first 24 hours of life. As a noun, the word "neonaticide" may also refer to anyone who practices or who has practiced this.

Neonaticide is relatively rare in developed countries, but most of these murders remain secret:

...every year, hundreds of women commit neonaticide: they kill their newborns or let them die. Most neonaticides remain undiscovered, but every once in a while a janitor follows a trail of blood to a tiny body in a trash bin, or a woman faints and doctors find the remains of a placenta inside her.

— Steven Pinker, The New York Times, 1997

Infanticide as a whole is more commonly committed by mothers than fathers, but neonaticide specifically is near-exclusively committed by mothers; fatherly cases of neonaticide are so rare that they are individually recorded. A 1999 United States Department of Justice study concluded that between 1976 and 1997 in the United States, mothers were responsible for a higher share of children killed during infancy, while fathers were more likely to have been responsible for the murders of children age eight or older.

== Statistics ==
90% of neonaticidal mothers are 25 years of age or younger. Less than 20% are married. Less than 30% are seen as psychotic or depressed. They have typically denied or concealed the pregnancy since conception.

For the period 1982–1987, approximately 1.1% of all homicides have been of children under one year of age. 8–9% of all murders are of persons under 18 years of age. Of these, almost twice as many sons as compared to daughters are victims. In half of the cases death occurs literally "at the hands of" the parent. Weapons are almost never used in neonaticide. Drowning, strangulation, head trauma, suffocation, and exposure to the elements are all common methods.

== Current law ==
=== Poland ===
Article 149 of the Penal Code of Poland stipulates that a mother who kills her child in labour, while under the influence of the course of the delivery, is liable to imprisonment for between three months and five years.

=== Romania ===
The new Penal Code of Romania, which came into force in 2014, resolved the issues of the previous Code, under which the law was unclear. Article 200 of the new Penal Code stipulates that the killing of a newborn during the first 24 hours, by the mother who is in a state of mental distress, shall be punished with imprisonment of one to five years.

=== Russia ===
Article 106 of the Criminal Code of Russia stipulates that the killing by a mother of her newborn child during or immediately after childbirth, or in a mentally traumatizing situation or in a state of mental disorder that does not reach insanity is punishable by deprivation of liberty for a term of two to four years or by imprisonment for a term of up to five years.

=== United States ===
In the U.S., the killing of a child after childbirth is illegal. Under the Born-Alive Infants Protection Act of 2002, a woman who gives birth after an attempted abortion is the mother of a born-alive infant if the infant is observed with any of the following signs of life: breathing, heartbeat, pulsation of the umbilical cord, or confirmed voluntary muscle movement, regardless of the gestational age of the child. Although medical guidelines recommend withholding resuscitation for infants with practically no chance of surviving, and allow parental discretion if the chance of survival is marginal, any child that has a better-than-marginal chance of survival who is allowed to die would be considered the victim of infanticide or neonaticide.

== History ==
An early reference to filicide (the killing of a child by a parent) is in Greek mythology. In his play Medea, Euripides portrayed Medea as having killed her two sons after Jason abandoned her for the daughter of the King of Corinth giving us what has been termed the Medea Complex. Under the Roman Law, patria potestas, the right of a father to kill his own children was protected. It was not until the 4th century that the Roman state, influenced by Christianity, began to regard filicide as a crime. Still, mothers who killed their infants or newborns received lesser sentences under both the laws of the church and the state.

The church consistently dealt more leniently with those mothers whose children died by overlaying, an accidental death by smothering when a sleeping parent rolled over on the infant. The opinions of the church in these deaths may reflect an awareness of one of society's first attempts to understand the severe problem of overpopulation and overcrowding. England has traditionally viewed infanticide as a "special crime," passing its first Infanticide Act in 1623 under the Stuarts and more recently in the Infanticide Acts of 1922 and 1938. Most recently England passed the Infanticide Act of 1978 which allows a lesser sentence for attempted infanticide. Unlike England and other European countries, the United States has not adopted special statutes to deal with infanticide or neonaticide. Nonetheless, juries and judges, as reflected in their verdicts and sentences, have consistently considered the difficulties and stresses of a mother during the post-partum period.

== Modern times ==
=== Australia ===
In June 2016 it was reported that 27 babies were born in Queensland hospitals in 2015, only to later die after not receiving care. This was also reported to be happening as early as 2007 in Victoria, where 52 babies were born alive after failed late-term abortions with accusations that some were "simply put on a shelf and left to die." This is generally accepted as fitting the definition of infanticide in Victoria and other states.

== Cultural aspects ==
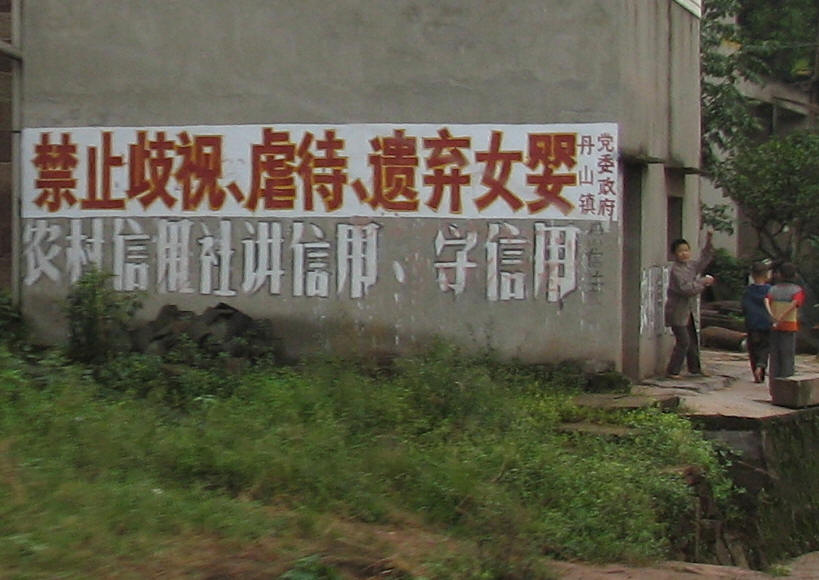
A roadside sign in rural Sichuan: "It is forbidden to discriminate against, abuse or abandon baby girls."

The Chinese, as late as the 20th century, killed newborn daughters because they were unable to transmit the family name. Additionally, daughters were viewed as weaker and not as useful in time of war or for agricultural work. In the past, Inuit killed infants with known congenital anomalies and often one of a set of twins. Similarly, Mohave Indians had killed all children of racially mixed ancestry at birth.

In their 1981 paper, Sakuta and Saito reviewed infanticide in Japan and describe the two distinct types of infanticide commonly seen. The Mabiki type corresponds to the ancient means of "thinning out" or population control; the Anomie type, a product of modern society, corresponds to the "unwanted child."

== Prevention ==
A number of studies have evaluated risk factors in infant homicide with the aim of preventing it.

Anonymous delivery, a system where mothers can give birth in a hospital for free without showing ID, has been found to reduce the rate of police reported neonaticides in Austria.

=== Baby hatch ===
In the Middle Ages and in the 18th and 19th centuries, a "foundling wheel" system was used where mothers could leave infants anonymously to be found and cared for. In modern times, baby hatch systems have been introduced in hospitals and other areas to allow mothers to leave children.

The hatches are usually in hospitals, social centres, or churches, and consist of a door or flap in an outside wall which opens onto a soft bed, heated or at least insulated. Sensors in the bed alert carers when a baby has been put in it so that they can come and take care of the child. In Germany, babies are first looked after for eight weeks during which the mother can return and claim her child without any legal repercussions. If this does not happen, after eight weeks the child is put up for adoption.

== See also ==
- Abortion
- Baby hatch
- Child euthanasia
- Infanticide
- Melissa Drexler
- Psychiatric disorders of childbirth
- Safe-haven law
- Unintended pregnancy
- Neonatal abandonment in Japan
