= Anonymous birth =

Legal concept allowing women to anonymously give birth and give the baby up for adoption

An anonymous birth is a birth where the mother gives birth to a child without disclosing her identity, or where her identity remains unregistered. In many countries, anonymous births have been legalized for centuries in order to prevent formerly frequent killings of newborn children, particularly outside of marriage.

In an anonymous birth, the mother's right of informational self-determination severely curtails the children's right to know about their biological ancestry, therefore going beyond the concept of a confidential birth, where the identity of the mother is registered but remains undisclosed, unless the grown up child requests disclosure at a later point.

== History ==
High rates of infant abandonment, child neglect, and neonaticide created the preventative systems of baby hatches, anonymous birth, confidential birth, which are forms of giving birth without personal information or privately disclosing information. Infant abandonment is a form of child abandonment where a parent leaves their infant in attempt to end their guardianship. Child neglect is the lack of care given to a child. Neonaticide is a form of infanticide where babies are killed within 24 hours of their birth. Particularly with neonaticide, women are predominantly young, unmarried, with unintended pregnancies. They also typically do not have a mental disorder. These women often hide their pregnancy and do not receive pre-natal care. Prevention of neonaticide, as well as, the other forms of child neglect, are through the anonymous and secretive measures of anonymous birth, confidential birth, and baby hatches.

Early systems of anonymous birth can be found in France and Sweden in the 1600s and 1700s. Within beginning of the 21st century, nations proposing the policy of anonymous birth, along with baby hatches, have been Switzerland, Austria, and Germany. In addition, the Czech Republic, Greece, Italy, Russia, and Ukraine, allow mothers to keep their identity private. Alternatively, a form of anonymous birth and confidential birth occurs in the U.S. through Safe-haven laws. Early anonymous birth legislation can be found in Sweden where the Infanticide Act of 1778 granted mothers both the right and all means to give birth to their child anonymously.

=== France ===
In France the tradition of anonymous births can be traced to 1638 when Vincent de Paul who instituted the tour, a form of baby hatch. During the French Revolution anonymous births were legalized in 1793, when Article 326 of the Code Civil introduced both the concepts of anonymous and confidential births. The decree provided for the creation of safe spaces for women to give birth safely. In 1811 the assistance was replaced with a system of baby hatches. This however caused a surge in abandoned babies and was never fully implemented. By 1860 the system of baby hatches called tours were all closed, and the practice was officially abolished in 1904 in favor of other pro-birth policies between 1870 and 1945. The pro-birth policies developed out of historical events of war and revolution. Anonymous birth still continued from the 1870s to 1940s with approximately 1000 children every year ending up in the system. Public hospitals, by 1941 were required to allow women to give birth anonymously if requested. In the 1940s, the official birth certificates in France recorded "sous X" meaning born under X in the place of their biological mother. In 1943 there was a waiting period of a month where mothers were still able to retain custody of their child if they gave them up. In 1960s waiting periods were extended to three months, health and social aid offices opened, and birth control was publicized by law. In 1978 a law allowed citizens access to personal documents, which for those born under X brought them to protest for their origins. In the 1990s conversation of the mother's right to privacy against the right of a child to know his origins was discussed, with the mother's right continuing to be upheld. In the 1990s there was also discussion of creating an organization to aid in information holding if a mother changes the decision to be anonymous which was created in the early 2000s. In 2002 a 'national council for access to personal origins' (CNAOP) was created to mediate between anonymous mothers and children. The birth mother is asked to leave information about her identity behind in a sealed envelope that can be opened by the CNAOP if the child ever asks, so that the birth mother can be contacted. However, the information is not to be given to the child without consent.

=== Sweden ===
Early anonymous birth legislation can be found in Sweden where the Infanticide Act of 1778 granted mothers both the right and all means to give birth to their child anonymously. Children born were documented with an unknown mother and would become a foster child. The measure lasted through the 1800s as infant deaths decreased. During this time other factors that contributed to child death as premarital intercourse and unmarried childbearing was punishable by fines to prison time between 1734 and 1865. The system of anonymous birth lasted in Sweden until 1917 when the child's right to know and be supported by mother was decided. After 1917 there were increased legislation on familial bonds and systems that still continue today. In 1998 Swedish legislation added a section of law to provide what is best for a child in custody. A social welfare committee investigates cases where children have been left anonymously to establish guardianship. Currently, there is no legislation allowing mothers to give birth anonymously.

=== Austria ===
From 1784 to 1910 at the General Hospital of Vienna mothers could give birth anonymously and leave their child with the hospital. The hospital was created by Emperor Joseph II and nearly 100 births a month were recorded in this practice. The children left had a high mortality rate, nearly all the children died in placement at a nursery or foster home, but this changed over time.

In 1974 Austria identified neonaticide as a major issue making it a specific crime. In 2002 Austria implicated the systems of anonymous birth and baby hatches legislation. From 2002 to 2004 Austria ran a campaign along with the preventive measures to lower neonaticide rates, but after 2004 neonaticide has been on the rise to rates comparable to pre-anonymous birth legislation in the late 1990s to early 2000s.

=== Germany ===
In the late 1990s and early 2000s the proposal of legal legislation for the system of anonymous birth in Germany was brought. Groups outside of the German government attempted to push for the policy three times in the early 2000s they each failed. An anonymous birth policy was passed in 2013 in Germany.

== Legal situation ==
In 2003, the European Court of Human Rights ruled in a case involving anonymous birth in Odièvre v. France. The applicant's mother had given birth anonymously; when the applicant later asked for more information, she was only given non-identifying information. The applicant appealed to the Court citing Article 8 of the European Convention on Human Rights, stating that it was a violation to the right to a family life. The Court noted that the case could not simply be viewed as a conflict between the rights of the birth mother and the child, because it also affected the rights of the adoptive parents and any family of the birth mother. The Court ruled that, given that the recently created National Council on Access to Information about Personal Origins presented an avenue to contact the birth mother in a controlled way, the state had attempted to strike a sufficient balance between the competing rights; the application was therefore denied.

== See also ==
- Adoption disclosure
- Baby hatch
- Confidential birth
- Infanticide
- Neonaticide
- Safe-haven laws
