= Coin-operated-locker babies =

Aspect of child abuse in Japan

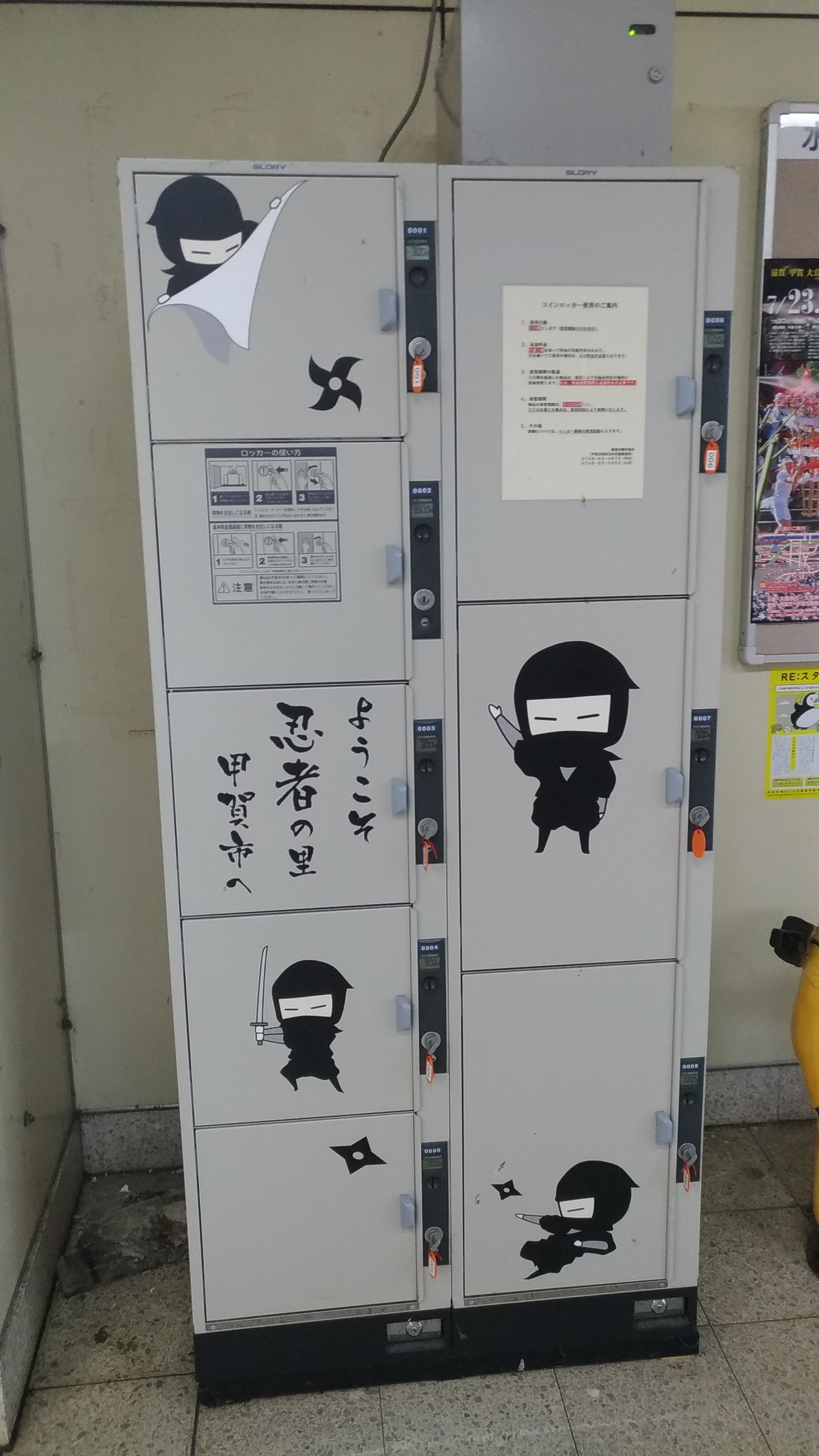
Coin-operated-locker in Kibukawa Station

Coin-operated-locker babies or coin-locker babies (Japanese: コインロッカーベイビー, romanized: koinrokkābeibī, lit. 'coin locker baby') are victims of child abuse that have occurred in Japan, in which infants are left in public lockers. There are two main variables that account for the differences in frequency and the type of these child abuse cases: social and economical. Predominantly affecting newborns and male babies, the murder of infants became a form of population control in Japan, being discovered 1–3 months after death, wrapped in plastic and appearing to have died of asphyxiation. The presumption is that such lockers are regularly checked by attendants and the infant will be found quickly; however, most are found dead. Between 1980 and 1990, there were 191 reported cases of infants which died in coin-operated lockers, which made up about 6 percent of all infanticides in the decade.

Hydrostatic lung tests, stomach and bowel tests can be performed by medical examiners or forensic pathologists, but the specific cause of death is often difficult to ascertain due to decomposition. In Japan, if a baby is determined to have been born alive, the mother is charged with homicide and the abandonment of a corpse. However, if the baby is proven to have been stillborn, the mother is charged only with the abandonment of a corpse. If the mother of the baby is discovered, she is rarely sentenced because she is considered to have been in a mentally unstable situation during and after the pregnancy. The grounds for this judgment have a historical precedent.

The regional government of Osaka organized a group dealing with the detection and protection of abused and neglected children. In 1993, a manual regarding child abuse was published, but the national Japanese judicial administration still uses old laws for child abuse cases.

In response to certain actions, in 1981, the number of cases began to decrease. These actions included the relocation of coin-lockers to make them more visible, with additional patrol assigned to monitor the locker locations. Further, the publication of the term and problem led to the recognition by the general public in Japan, leading to stronger education about contraception to decrease the number of unwanted babies. Though the Osaka government organized group created programs, such as Baby Hatch, this is still a prevalent issue in Japan. In Kumamoto prefecture, Jikei hospital's baby hatch program, "Konotori no yurikago" ("Stork's Cradle"), modeled after German Babyklappen, was said to encourage child abandonment after news that a three-year-old child was left on the first day of operation on May 10, 2007, increasing criticism of the program.

An adoption system proposed by Noboru Kikuta that protected the biological mothers' records of child birth and adoption had also been proposed but was not recognized in the special adoption system in 1987.

During the 1970s, reported cases of coin-locker babies increased along with other news of maternal filicide. The women's liberation movement, ūman ribu, was concerned with the biased treatment against criminalized mothers and criticized Japan's family institution. Maternal filicide was interpreted as a violent reaction against being forced into socially accepted spousal and maternal roles.

== Common reasons ==
=== Isolation and poverty ===
In many cases, the mothers are individuals who lack financial stability and would not have been able to support a child. They may have come from homes of violence or have neglected themselves, growing up in isolation and causing them to be reluctant to use public services. In the contemporary society of Japan, it is often difficult for women to earn enough money to support a child, leading many women to turn to the sex industry.

=== Age ===
The people who leave children in coin-operated-lockers can be a variety of ages, and this is a social factor that plays a large part in the child abandonment problem in Japan.

=== Taboo ===
Sex, abortion, and unwanted pregnancies are considered taboo subjects within the Japanese culture, which contributes to the problem of child abandonment in Japan, making the solution of the coin-operated-locker much more attractive.

== Laws ==
In 1981, the number of coin-operated-locker babies began to decrease because the following actions:

- Coin-operated-lockers were relocated to make them more visible and patrols were assigned to monitor these areas.
- The problem of coin-operated-locker babies was publicised and became recognised by the general population.
- Education about contraception, as a form of birth control to a wider number of people, decreased the number of unwanted babies.

Aside from this, recently, the government of Osaka created a group designed to focus specifically on the abuse and protection of abused and neglected children, publishing a manual on how to deal with child abuse in 1993.

Despite the measures in place to stop the occurrence of this type of child abuse, coin-operated-locker babies are still found today. The classifications of the crimes are as follows:

- If the baby was a stillborn baby it is not considered child abuse.
- If the baby was born alive and: (a) was killed soon after birth, then abandoned, it is considered homicide; (b) if the baby is killed several days after birth, it is considered homicide and neglect; and (c) if the baby is found alive, but abandoned in the coin-operated-locker, it is considered severe neglect.

The existing laws in place to protect children from child abuse prevent many professionals from taking action. However, because the number of child abuse social workers are understaffed, they are poorly paid and overworked, resulting in the neglect and abuse of babies in Japan. These reasons have also been the reason as to why many do not want to go into the field.

== Baby hatches and child abandonment in Japan ==
In response to the high child abandonment rate in Japan, Jikei Hospital introduced the idea of establishing the nation's first baby hatch. A baby hatch or baby box is a place where people, typically mothers can bring babies, usually newborn, and abandon them anonymously in a safe place to be found and cared for. The idea was made public in late 2006. Based on similar services found in Italy, Germany and South Korea, Jikei Hospital argued that the rate of abandonment would decrease by providing custody for children whose parents cannot give sufficient care. Under the official name Kounotori no Yurikago ("White Stork's Cradle") the system has been in operation since May 2007. In its 13 years of operation, Kounotori no Yurikago has taken care of 155 babies (as of March 2020). Children in the hospital's custody are eventually sent further to other institutions or foster care.

== Timeline of recent cases ==
- May 2, 1999: A Japanese couple left their five-month-old child in a coin-operated locker in Kawasaki to go eat a late night snack. They told the police they thought the child would be safe because air could get into the locker. She was held there for more than 30 minutes.
- 31 May 2018: A newborn baby girl's corpse was found inside a coin locker in the Kabukicho in the Shinjuku area of Tokyo. The infant still had her umbilical cord attached wrapped in a vinyl bag in a suitcase. The infant had been strangled, and was dead for a week before the police found her.
- 26 September 2018: Tokyo police arrest a 49-year-old woman by the name of Emiri Suzaki, suspected of leaving her stillborn baby in a coin-operated locker at Uguisudani Station in Tokyo for several years. Panicking after not giving birth to a living child, she kept the body as she “could not dispose of it” and continued to pay the storage fees throughout the years. After leaving the home of a male acquaintance after an argument, Suzaki left the key behind. Afraid her friend would discover the body in the locker, she turned herself in to the police and confessed.
- June 6, 2021: A body of a newborn of an unknown gender was found in a coin-operated locker at a shopping center at JR Ofuna Station in Kamakura, Kanagawa Prefecture in Japan. The identity of the person who left the baby has not been found.
- June 10, 2022: A 22-year-old was arrested in Hokkaido for leaving the body of a newborn baby in the coin-operated lockers at Chitose station. Ayano Koseki admitted to the charges, confessing she had left her son stored in a cooler.

== See also ==
- Harm reduction
- Baby hatch
- Neonatal abandonment in Japan
