= COLB =

COLB may refer to:

- Certificate of Live Birth
- coin-operated-locker babies
