= Foundling hospital =

Institution where abandoned children were cared for

A foundling hospital was originally an institution for the reception of foundlings, i.e., children who had been abandoned or exposed, and left for the public to find and save. A foundling hospital was not necessarily a medical hospital, but more commonly a children's home, offering shelter and education to foundlings.

The antecedents of such institutions was the practice of the Catholic Church providing a system of relief, children being left (jactati) in marble shells at the church doors, and tended first by the matricularii or male nurses, and then by the nutricarii or foster parents. But it was in the 7th and 8th centuries that definite institutions for foundlings were established in such towns as Trèves, Milan and Montpellier.

Historically, care for foundlings tended to develop more slowly or with greater variation from country to country than, for example, care for orphans. The reason for this discrepancy was the perception that children abandoned by their parents carried with them a burden of immorality. Their parents tended to be unmarried and poor. Alleviating the burden of unwanted pregnancies was often seen as encouraging infidelity and prostitution. Thomas Malthus, for example, the noted English demographer and economist, made, in his The Principles of Population (vol. i. p. 434), a violent attack on foundling hospitals. He argued that they discouraged marriage and therefore population, and that even the best management would be unable to prevent a high mortality. He wrote: "An occasional child murder from false shame is saved at a very high price if it can be done only by the sacrifice of some of the best and most useful feelings of the human heart in a great part of the nation".

== Foundling hospitals in the world ==
=== Austria ===
In Austria foundling hospitals occupied a very prominent place in the general instructions which, by rescript dated 16 April 1781, the emperor Joseph II issued to the charitable endowment commission. In 1818 foundling asylums and lying-in houses were declared to be state institutions. They were accordingly supported by the state treasury until the fundamental law of 20 October 1860 handed them over to the provincial committees. As of 1910, they were local institutions, depending on provincial funds, and were quite separate from the ordinary parochial poor institute. Admission was free when the child was actually found on the street, or was sent by a criminal court, or where the mother undertook to serve for four months as nurse or midwife in an asylum, or produced a certificate from the parish priest and poor-father (the parish inspector of the poor-law administration) that she had no money. In other cases payments of thirty to 100 florins were made. When two months old the child was sent for six or ten years to the houses in the neighborhood of respectable married persons, who had certificates from the police or the poor-law authorities, and who were inspected by the latter and by a special medical officer. These persons received a constantly diminishing allowance, and the arrangement could be determined by fourteen days notice on either side. The foster-parents could retain the child in their service or employment till the age of twenty-two, but the true parents could at any time reclaim the foundling on reimbursing the asylum and compensating the foster-parents.

=== Belgium ===
In this country the arrangements for the relief of foundlings and the appropriation of public funds for that purpose very much resemble those in France (see below), and can hardly be usefully described apart from the general questions of local government and poor law administration. The Commissions des Hospices Civiles, however, are purely communal bodies, although they receive pecuniary assistance from both the départments and the state. A decree of 1811 directed that there should be an asylum and a wheel for receiving foundlings in every arrondissement. The last wheel, that of Antwerp, was closed in 1860.

=== France ===
In Louis XIII's France, St. Vincent de Paul rescued, with the help of the Louise de Marillac and other religious ladies, the foundlings of Paris from the horrors of a primitive institution named La Couche (on the rue St Landry), and ultimately obtained from Louis XIV the use of the Bicêtre for their accommodation. Letters patent were granted to the Paris hospital in 1670. The Hôtel-Dieu of Lyon was the next in importance. No provision, however, was made outside the great towns; the houses in the cities were overcrowded and administered with laxity; and in 1784 Jacques Necker prophesied that the state would yet be seriously embarrassed by this increasing evil. From 1452 to 1789 the law had imposed on the seigneurs de haute justice the duty of succouring children found deserted on their territories.

The foundling hospitals had been started as a reform to save the numerous infants who were being abandoned in the streets of Paris. Infant mortality at that date was extremely high – about 50 percent, in large part because families sent their infants to be wet nursed. The mortality rate in the foundling hospitals, which also sent the babies out to be wet nursed, proved worse, however, and most of the infants sent there likely perished.

The first constitutions of the French Revolution undertook as a state debt the support of every foundling. For a time premiums were given to the mothers of illegitimate children, the enfants de la patrie, by the law of 12 Brumaire, An II. Toute recherche de la paternité est interdite, while by art. 341 of the Code Napoléon, la recherche de la matérnité est admise. As of 1904, laws of France relating to this part of what is called l'Assistance publique were:

- the decree of January 1811
- the instruction of February 1823
- the decree of 5 March 1852
- the law of De l'administration des finances of 5 May 1869
- the law of 24 July 1889, and
- the law of 27 June 1904

These laws carried out the general principles of the law of 7 Frimaire An V., which completely decentralized the system of national poor relief established by the Revolution. The enfants assistés included, besides (1) orphans and (2) foundlings proper, (3) children abandoned by their parents, (4) ill-treated, neglected or morally abandoned children whose parents have been deprived of their parental rights by the decision of a court of justice, and (5) children, under sixteen years of age, of parents condemned for certain crimes, whose parental rights have been delegated by a tribunal to the state. Children classified under 1-5 were termed pupilles de l'assistance, wards of public charity, and were distinguished by the law of 1904 from children under the protection of the state, classified as: (1) enfants secourus, i.e., children whose parents or relatives are unable, through poverty, to support them; (2) enfants en dépôt, i.e., children of persons undergoing a judicial sentence and children temporarily taken in while their parents are in hospital, and (3) enfants en garde, i.e., children who have either committed or been the victim of some felony or crime and are placed under state care by judicial authority.

The asylum which received all these children was a departmental (établissement dépositaire), and not a communal institution. The établissement dépositaire was usually the ward of a hospice, in which, with the exception of children en dépôt the stay was the shortest, for by the law of 1904, continuing the principle laid down in 1811, all children under thirteen years of age under the guardianship of the state, except the mentally or physically infirm, must be boarded out in country districts. They were generally apprenticed to someone engaged in the agricultural industry, and until majority they remained under the guardianship of the administrative commissioners of the département. The state paid the whole of the cost of inspection and supervision.

The expenses of administration, the home expenses, for the nurse (nourrice sédentaire) or the wet nurse (nourrice au sein), the prime de survie (premium on survival), washing, clothes, and the outdoor expenses, which include (1) temporary assistance to unmarried mothers in order to prevent desertion; (2) allowances to the foster-parents (nourriciers) in the country for board, school-money, etc.; (3) clothing; (4) travelling-money for nurses and children; (5) printing, etc.; (6) expenses in time of sickness and for burials and apprentice fees were borne in the proportion of two-fifths by the state, two-fifths by the département, and the remaining fifth by the communes.

The droit de recherche was conceded to the parent on payment of a small fee. The decree of 1811 contemplated the repayment of all expenses by a parent reclaiming a child. The same decree directed a tour or revolving box (Drehcylinder in Germany) to be kept at each hospital. These have been discontinued. The Assistance publique of Paris was managed by a directeur appointed by the minister of the interior, and associated with a representative conseil de surveillance.

The Paris Hospice des enfants-assistés contained about 700 beds. There were also in Paris numerous private charities for the adoption of poor children and orphans. It is impossible here to give even a sketch of the long and able controversies which occurred in France on the principles of management of foundling hospitals, the advantages of tours and the system of admission à bureau ouvert, the transfer of orphans from one département to another, the hygiene and service of hospitals and the inspection of nurses, the education and reclamation of the children and the rights of the state in their future.

=== Great Britain ===
==== England ====
The Foundling Hospital of London was incorporated by Royal Charter in 1739 for "the maintenance and education of exposed and deserted young children." The petition of Thomas Coram, who is entitled to the whole credit of the foundation, states as its objects to prevent the frequent murders of poor miserable children at their birth, and to suppress the inhuman custom of exposing newborn infants to perish in the streets. The Foundling Hospital kept receiving children until the 1950s, when British law changed the focus in care for foundlings from children's homes to foster care and adoption. The Foundling Hospital is now a child care charity called Coram Family. Its history and art collection are on display at the Foundling Museum.

==== Scotland ====
Scotland never seems to have possessed a foundling hospital. In 1759 John Watson left funds which were to be applied to the pious and charitable purpose of preventing child murder by the establishment of a hospital for receiving pregnant women and taking care of their children as foundlings. But by an act of parliament in 1822, which sets forth doubts as to the propriety of the original purpose, the money was given to trustees to erect a hospital for the maintenance and education of destitute children.

=== Ireland ===
==== Dublin ====
In 1704 the Foundling hospital of Dublin was opened. From 1,500 to 2,000 children were received annually. Due to the high mortality and financial cost of the hospital, in 1835 Lord Glenelg (then Irish Secretary) closed the institution.

==== Cork ====
A Foundling Hospital in Cork was opened in 1747 at Leitrim Street, following a 1735 Act of the Irish Parliament. It was funded by local taxes. The building site, now occupied by the Lady's Well or Murphy's Brewery, was based around a small quadrangle with a chapel, school-rooms, boys dormitories, girls dormitories, and staff apartments. Following the enactment of the Poor Laws in Ireland the Poor Law Union workhouses replaced many of the functions of the Foundling Hospital. In Cork, the Union Workhouse was opened on Douglas Road in 1841. The Foundling Hospital at Leitrim Street subsequently closed in July 1855, when it was converted by the Emigration Commissioners for use as an Emigration depot.

=== Italy ===
As of 1910, Italy was very rich in foundling hospitals, pure and simple, orphans and other destitute children being separately provided for. In Rome one branch of the Santo Spirito in Sassia (so called from the Schola Saxonum built in 728 by King Ina in the Borgo) was, since the time of Pope Sixtus IV, devoted to foundlings. The average annual number of foundlings supported was about 3,000. In Venice the Casa degli Esposti or foundling hospital, founded in 1346, and receiving 450 children annually, was under provincial administration. The splendid legacy of the last doge, Ludovico Manin, was applied to the support of about 160 children by the Congregazione di Carità acting through thirty parish boards (deputazione fraternate).

=== Russia ===
Under the old Russian system of Peter I foundlings were received at the church windows by a staff of women paid by the state. But starting in the reign of Catherine II, foundling hospitals were in the hands of the provincial officer of public charity (prykaz obshestvennago pryzrenya). The great central institutions (Vospitatelnoi Dom), at Moscow and St. Petersburg (with a branch at Gatchina), were founded by Catherine. When a child was brought to these institutions the baptismal name was asked, and a receipt was given, by which the child could be reclaimed up to the age of ten. After the usual period of six years in the country, care was taken with the education, especially of the more promising children. The hospitals served as a valuable source of recruits for the public service. The rights of parents over their children were very much restricted, and those of the government much extended by a ukase issued by the emperor Nicholas I in 1837.

=== United States ===
As of 1910, in the United States of America, foundling hospitals, which are chiefly private charities, existed in most of the large cities.

== See also ==
- Baby hatch
- Child abandonment
- Orphanage
- Street children
