= Confidential birth =

Birth document

In a confidential birth, the mother provides her identity to authorities, but requires that her identity not be disclosed by the authorities. In many countries, confidential births have been legalized for centuries in order to prevent formerly frequent killings of newborn children, particularly outside of marriage.

The mother's right of informational self-determination suspends the child's right to know about their biological ancestry until she changes her mind or until the adult child requests disclosure at a later point. The alternative concept of an anonymous birth, where the mother does not disclose her identity to the authorities at all, or where her identity remains infinitely undisclosed, goes beyond this.

== History ==
An early forerunner of confidential birth legislation can be found in Sweden, where the Infanticide Act of 1778 granted mothers both the right and means to give birth to a child anonymously. The act's 1856 amendment, however, restricted this legislation to confidential births, where the midwife was ordered to keep the mother's name in a sealed envelope.

In France, confidential births were legalized in 1793, when Article 326 of the Code Civil introduced both the concepts of anonymous and confidential births.

=== Infanticide ===
Infanticide by definition is a person deliberately killing a child who had yet to reach the age of discretion, which varies by location, but is generally considered to be nine years old, though in the Catholic Church, this age is seven. If a mother kills her child and is married, then the case would not be tried as infanticide but as common law under murder. If the child was stillborn, the mother was to prove it by one witness and documentation by an official of the newborn's death.

Infanticide was common in the eighteenth and nineteenth centuries due to the difficulty of prosecution and the nature of the offense. In most places, a humanitarian view led to those prosecuting to consider that when newborns were killed by unmarried adolescents, that punishment should be less harsh.

Infanticide decreased as resolutions came about which changed the perceptions of females to themselves and others. Some societies came to realize that oppressive behavior towards women often led to the death of their children. This encouraged society to reconsider the patterns and roles that they play.

== Legal situation in the United States ==
=== The Right to Privacy ===
This section gives historical background on privacy in the United States and how it came into play for the right of sealed birth records and confidential birth in the US.

The growth of privacy in America was a slow development. In the Constitution of the United States and its Bill of Rights, the term "private" is used, such as private property, but the term "privacy" is not used, and the concept of a personal right to privacy was not emphasized except in the Fourth Amendment, which states "The right of the people to be secure in their persons, houses, papers, and effects, against unreasonable searches and seizures, shall not be violated", and in the Fifth Amendment's guarantee against self-incrimination. Other rights to privacy were implied through the language of the laws, but were not explicitly governmentally protected. It was not until the 1850s that a more broad concept of privacy began to be sought as a right, beginning with the invention of the telegraph, due to instances of illegal transcription of messages.

Sealed records law was installed in 1917, allowing both parties to benefit from confidentiality, mainly the state and whoever else was involved. Birth certificates are sealed for those adopted, so that the adoptive parents feel autonomy from the biological parents and receive the privacy that birth parents have. The sealed records law allows anyone adopted to create their own fate without influence from biological parents and their origins.

A greater expansion of governmentally-protected rights to privacy eventually came in the 1965 US Supreme Court case of Griswold v. Connecticut, in which it was argued that there should be a broader, stronger constitutional and legal basis for those seeking privacy in general. Griswold v. Connecticut began as the State of Connecticut v. Estelle T. Griswold and C. Lee Buxton, in which Connecticut sought to enforce its 1879 Comstock law against providing birth control or giving advice about it. Estelle Griswold was executive director of the Planned Parenthood League of Connecticut, who with Buxton, medical director for the League, operated a birth control clinic in New Haven. Griswold felt that medically prescribed methods of birth control should be offered and available to married women, for the health of mothers and their economic and emotional stability. Dr. Buxton testified that he advised married women regarding certain methods of birth control to preserve the lives and health of women with certain medical conditions. In Connecticut, devices such as condoms were widely available for preventing the transmission of venereal diseases, and the appellants argued that advice on the use of these devices for birth control for medical purposes should also be permitted. Connecticut argued that a physician must abide by the law's anti-contraception statute. Griswold and Buxton were found guilty under the General Statutes of the State of Connecticut because they assisted women for the purpose of preventing conception rather than for medical reasons. Griswold appealed her conviction to the US Supreme Court, on the grounds that her clients' right to privacy was being violated. The case was argued by the lawyer for Griswold and Buxton, Thomas Emerson. The Court voted seven to two in favor of the appellants, and in its decision, expanded privacy protections to peripheral activities as well, citing the First, Third, Fourth, Fifth, Ninth, and Fourteenth Amendments to the US Constitution.

=== Reasons for Confidential Birth and Birth Records not being of Public Matter ===
Some women choose not to give their personal information when giving birth to a child as a matter of personal privacy. They feel that the information asked is too personal and is not useful for medical records. Questions asked include: What is the highest level of education reached by both parents? What is the standing employment for parents? How many times has the mother terminated pregnancies? Did the mother smoke during pregnancy, before, or after? How many cigarettes per day? What was the alcohol use per day before and during pregnancy? To be able to receive a birth certificate, the mother must fill out the questionnaire, and her answers are stored by the National Center for Health Statistics in a confidential data set, but the data is saved with the mother's name attached.

It is often adolescents who decide to have confidential births and confidential adoptions. Some have unresolved issues with their family and in other aspects of their life, having not yet reached the age at which they can fully link their actions to possible consequences. Without the psychological maturity of adulthood, it can be difficult for an adolescent to take on the task of parenting an infant. Pregnant adolescents can have various difficult reactions, including denial and self-blame, or seeing the pregnancy as a way to solve depression or to affirm femininity. Relinquishing responsibility often leads to adoption, in hopes to give the child a better life and to allow one or both parents to retain their freedom. The mother is asked whether she wants to relinquish her parental rights, but also whether she wants to keep in contact with the child.

Birth record statistics are affected by problems in acquiring records regarding children who are born out of wedlock, of unknown parentage, are legitimated, or are adopted. The American Association of Registration Executives and the Council on Vital Records and Statistics released a statement on the need for a nationwide policy on the confidential nature of birth records which will (1) assure the confidentiality of all birth records; (2) regulate the completeness and accuracy of all information given in birth reports, adoptions, and legitimations; (3) allow the individual to secure information regarding their birth or family relationships; (4) protect individuals (both the child and others) from the release of information that is undesired. This policy of secured birth records requires that the data be complete and accurate since individuals need certification of their birth for various official needs. Also, health and social agencies need this information for statistical and administrative purposes, while not allowing the information to be available to the general public.

=== Change from Traditional Confidential Adoption to Open Adoption ===
Confidential adoption: non-identifying information is made available, or those who keep the confidential records still exchange, through an agency, the biological parents' medical data to the adoptive parents.

Open Adoption: identifying data is exchanged through contact between the adoptive parents and biological parents, and is encouraged. Contact continues throughout the life of the child via letters, gifts, photographs, etc., or even visits between both sets of parents and the child. Some families put limits on meetings between the biological parents and their child, while others maintain more open relationships.

== See also ==
- Baby hatch
- Adoption disclosure
- Foundling
- Infanticide
- Birth Control
- Griswold v. Connecticut
