= Neonatal abandonment in Japan =

Neonatal abandonment
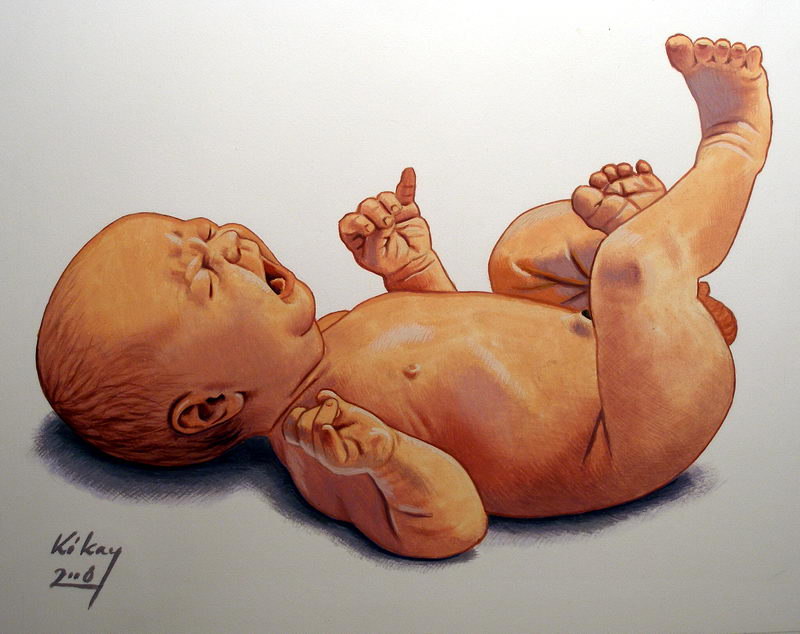
- Newborn baby
- Also known as: Infanticide, neonaticide
- Target: Newborn infants shortly after birth
- Common locations: Parks, restrooms, garbage collection sites, private residences
- Associated crimes: Infanticide, murder, abandonment, concealment of a corpse
- Underlying issues: Isolated birth, unintended pregnancy, teenage pregnancy, child abuse, sex education, contraception, abortion
- Countermeasures: Pregnancy counseling, childbirth support, baby hatch, confidential birth
- Related agencies: Children and Families Agency, local governments, medical institutions

Neonatal abandonment (shinseiji-iki) refers to the act of abandoning a newborn infant shortly after birth in places such as parks or restrooms. When a mother kills the infant or in cases of stillbirth, this may constitute injury resulting in death, abandonment by a person responsible for protection resulting in death, or corpse abandonment, and is also referred to as "infanticide" in child abuse research. In Japan, infants aged 0 account for a high proportion of child abuse fatalities.

The background includes adolescent pregnancy, unwanted pregnancy and lack of sex education, and difficulty in accessing contraception and abortion, while a structure exists where only the women who abandon their babies are criticized. It has been pointed out that confidential birth, which is available in other countries, is only implemented in Japan at limited facilities through voluntary activities of maternity hospitals. There are issues related to reproductive health and rights. The "International Technical Guidance on Sexuality Education" created primarily by UNESCO and WHO has not been incorporated into Japanese education, and in March 2025, the Japan Federation of Bar Associations issued a statement calling for comprehensive sexuality education based on these standards to be included in the Course of Study.

Obstetricians and gynecologists have stated that it is not uncommon for men to refuse contraception even when both parties do not want children. In 2022, in Kanagawa Prefecture alone, four mothers were arrested on suspicion of abandoning infant corpses, highlighting the need to strengthen support systems for women who give birth in isolation. During the 1980s, a number of infant deaths occurred in coin‑operated lockers in Japan, and the children involved came to be referred to as ‘Coin-operated-locker babies.’

== Overview ==
In Japan, infants aged 0 account for a high proportion of child abuse fatalities. Over many years, more than half of children who die from abuse have been infants aged 0. According to a report by the Rainbow Center for Children, which conducts analysis of child abuse, for convenience, all killings and abuse deaths of infants aged 0 are broadly referred to as "infanticide", and among these, killings within the first 24 hours after birth are specifically called "neonaticide". Additionally, in legal and police terminology, the killing of infants under one year of age is referred to as "infanticide".

As of October 2025, according to the most recent statistics, it has been reported that 9 babies died on the day of birth in 2023, and over the past 20 years, 185 babies have died on day 0 of life. In fiscal year 2023, excluding murder-suicides, there were 48 abuse deaths nationwide. Of these, 18 were newborns less than one month old, and 15 were abandoned immediately after birth and died. These 15 babies were abandoned immediately after birth and died, and there exists an isolated birth problem where their mothers gave birth in isolated situations due to unexpected pregnancies and were unable to consult with those around them, leading to abandonment. Furthermore, at "Ninshin Sotto SOS Yamanashi" operated by the social welfare corporation Kosodate-chi Hattatsu no Sato in Kai City, 252 people consulted over a five-year period, and there is an adolescent pregnancy problem where those aged 17 and under, including high school and junior high school students, accounted for the largest proportion at 30% of consultants.

== Cases ==
=== Fatal cases ===
Multiple incidents of abandonment involving birth in toilets have occurred in various locations. Corpse abandonment at garbage collection sites has also occurred. In 2010, an 18-year-old high school senior in Setagaya Ward, Tokyo was arrested, and in May 2024, the body of a male infant was found in Yokohama. There are also cases of home births where bodies are hidden in closets. Cases where multiple infant bodies are discovered have occurred, with cohabiting family members testifying they were unaware.

In July 2025, an unemployed 17-year-old girl in Fukuoka City who gave birth at home, put the body in a garbage bag and abandoned it near the entrance, stated "I wanted someone to find it and hold a memorial service". In December 2024, a 30-year-old restaurant worker in Okinawa City abandoned a newborn's body on her home premises after giving birth. She was arrested after cohabiting family members who were unaware of the pregnancy reported it. In April of the same year, a 25-year-old woman was arrested for killing her child at her home in Hirosaki, Aomori Prefecture and burying the body in a flower bed at her family home in Hokuto, Hokkaido. During the trial, it was revealed that as a minor, she had an abortion in the third year of junior high school and committed a juvenile neonatal abandonment offense after isolated birth in her first year of high school. She received a prison sentence of 6 years.

Incidents of burying bodies in parks have occurred in Osaka Prefecture by a 23-year-old mother in August 2025, in Tokyo by a 23-year-old mother in November 2019, and in Yokohama by a 20-year-old mother in November 2022. All were employed as part-time workers. One case involved a male and female prefectural high school student conspiring to bury a body in vacant land in Hiratsuka. In 2025, a 17-year-old part-time worker mother in Ishikari City gave birth at home, packed the infant's body in a bag and left it on someone else's property and was arrested. Cohabiting family members were unaware. In October of the same year, a 19-year-old part-time worker was arrested for abandoning the body of a female infant with umbilical cord attached in vacant land in Kakamigahara.

== Murder ==
=== Isolated birth, willful negligence and abandonment ===
In September 2025, the trial of a 25-year-old man was held at Maebashi District Court in Gunma Prefecture for allegedly proposing to place the child in a facility after a cohabiting woman gave birth at home in 2022, then killing the infant in the bathroom and abandoning the body at the apartment's garbage collection site. He admitted to the charges.

In 2016 in Tochigi Prefecture, a 16-year-old high school girl was arrested on suspicion of murder for giving birth in a station toilet and abandoning the infant in a parking lot. She stated she did not want anyone to know about the pregnancy or birth.

In 2022, Aichi Prefectural Police arrested an unemployed 21-year-old man and 20-year-old woman on suspicion of corpse abandonment for leaving an infant's body at a hotel in a busy district of Nagoya. Both acknowledged being the child's parents and said they were troubled because they had no money. In April 2025 in Ueda, Nagano Prefecture, a 16-year-old high school girl was arrested for abandoning a baby's body at home. She was later re-arrested on suspicion of murder for recognizing the possibility of death.

==== Isolated birth, murder ====
Although not abandonment, multiple infanticide cases by high school students after isolated birth have occurred. In 2021, a 17-year-old high school girl was arrested on suspicion of killing her child with scissors after giving birth in a toilet at a commercial facility in Tochigi Prefecture.

In August 2025, an 18-year-old part-time worker woman and a 19-year-old construction worker man were arrested on suspicion of killing a newborn baby girl weighing approximately 4,200 grams by putting her in a garbage bag, tying it shut and suffocating her. In September 2025 in Toshima Ward, Tokyo, a 22-year-old female employee was arrested on suspicion of strangling her child to death after giving birth in the toilet of the girls bar where she worked.

==== Isolated birth, murder, abandonment ====
In April 2022, the body of a bagged infant was found at a garbage disposal area in an apartment building in Kawasaki. A 24-year-old woman with parents from Thailand and borderline intellectual functioning was unable to consult with her cohabiting 24-year-old male partner about her pregnancy and drowned the baby after isolated birth in the bathroom. The man testified that he also bore responsibility. The woman received a suspended sentence and later married him.

=== Survival cases ===
In August 2013, a baby with umbilical cord attached was found wrapped in a towel and left at a garbage disposal site, and a third-year junior high school girl was arrested on suspicion of abandonment by a person responsible for protection.

In June 2024, a 22-year-old woman was arrested on suspicion of attempting to kill a baby she gave birth to at the residence of a cohabiting man in Nerima Ward, Tokyo, by abandoning it in a nearby residential garbage bin. The child was discovered by chance and protected, and it was revealed at trial that the woman had searched for information about prison sentences for neonatal abandonment. In August 2025 in Naha, a 33-year-old mother was arrested on suspicion of abandonment by a person responsible for protection after an infant was left in shrubbery.

=== History ===
Such incidents have continued to occur in the 2020s. Meanwhile, in modern times, infants may be placed in a surviving state at "Kōnotori no Yurikago" (Stork's Cradle), also known as a baby hatch, which opened in 2007, or at infant protection facilities. Saitama Medical University's Yoshimura Koichi and colleagues conducted forensic analysis of 729 cases of "sudden infant death" discovered in Tokyo's 23 wards over 13 years from 1964, and observed a declining trend in infanticide.

Multiple international studies and reports from Japan indicate that unwanted or unplanned pregnancies can be a risk factor for suicidal ideation and suicidal behavior during pregnancy and postpartum. International systematic reviews point out that the risk of suicide during the perinatal period is relatively higher in young women and those with a history of mental illness.

In Japan, a survey of Tokyo's 23 wards confirmed 63 suicides by women during pregnancy and within one year after childbirth between 2005 and 2014, positioning suicide as one of the main causes of maternal mortality. Domestically, between 2022 and 2024, there were 162 pregnant and postpartum women who died by suicide during pregnancy or within one year after childbirth. It is analyzed that unwanted pregnancies and relationships with partners psychologically affected them as main factors.

== Background ==
=== Environment surrounding pregnant women and their characteristics ===
Kumamoto Jikei Hospital 2020

It has been pointed out that many cases involve pregnant women who face problems such as indifference from cohabiting family members, inability to consult with cohabiting family members, lack of knowledge about pregnancy and childbirth, absence of someone to consult with, and ignorance of where to seek consultation.

Dr. Hasuda, director of Jikei Hospital in Kumamoto, which operates Kōnotori no Yurikago, states that women who use "confidential birth" or who kill or abandon their newborns share a common trait of stubbornly hiding their pregnancy and birth, often have poor parent-child relationships due to abuse, and have a high degree of isolation. In the current situation, the child's right to know their birth origins is subordinated to the priority of preserving life.

Behind unwanted pregnancies are cases caused by lack of sexual knowledge due to intellectual or developmental disabilities and situations where victims cannot report abuse, and the United Nations has issued recommendations for improvement regarding sex education for people with disabilities. There are also pregnancies resulting from domestic violence and rape, and some cases involved women who had consulted with Jikei Hospital about confidential birth but died by suicide. There are also cases where women working in the sex industry were forced by customers to engage in sexual intercourse, resulting in pregnancy.

=== Inadequate sex education ===
Some children do not understand the connection between sexual intercourse and pregnancy, and advocates have stated in interviews that sex education based on a human rights perspective is necessary to prevent unintended pregnancies and address sexual victimization.

In December 2021, a 25-year-old woman with an intellectual disability gave birth without knowledge of pregnancy at a group home in Chiba Prefecture and threw the newborn boy out of a window, resulting in his death. In December 2019, a 25-year-old woman with an intellectual disability in Saga Prefecture gave birth to a baby girl at home and left the body unattended.

In school education, “Life Safety Education” was introduced starting in fiscal year 2023; however, the so-called “brake provision,” which avoids covering the process of pregnancy as stipulated in the 1998 national curriculum guidelines, remains in effect. Organizations supporting isolated pregnant women have argued that, in order to prevent "teenage pregnancy" from becoming a cause of child abuse deaths, sex education aligned with UNESCO's International Technical Guidance on Sexuality Education, which is considered a global standard, should be implemented.

=== Unreliability of contraceptive methods and limited access to emergency contraception ===
In Japan, 75% of contraception relies on male condoms, while oral contraceptives used by women account for only 6%, indicating a strong dependence on male-controlled method． While the typical-use failure rate of condoms is said to be approximately 15%, oral contraceptives are 99.7% effective when used correctly; however, their prevalence in Japan remains low compared with other countries.

Among 1,414 women prescribed emergency contraception, the most common reason given was that the condom broke or slipped off, followed by not using a condom at all. Removing a condom during intercourse without the partner's consent, known as "stealthing", has been classified as rape in England and Wales with resulting convictions; however, in Japan, if there is consent to intercourse itself, the act is not criminalized as such. A survey of physicians regarding over-the-counter access to emergency contraception found that 90% had experience prescribing it; 95.5% cited condom breakage or slippage as the reason, while cases involving non-consensual intercourse (36.1%) and sexual violence (32.1%) were also included.

Various contraceptive methods widely used overseas (including subdermal contraceptive implants, contraceptive patches, vaginal rings and injectable contraceptives) are not approved in Japan. Although oral contraceptives are known to be effective for conditions such as dysmenorrhea and their use doubled following the introduction of online medical consultations—reaching a prevalence of 6.1% in fiscal year 2022—this remains low compared with other countries, where usage reached 40% in Canada in 2006 and 10% in the United States in 2019.

In August 2025, Aska Pharmaceutical's emergency contraceptive "NorLevo", for which approval as a switch OTC drug had been applied for in June 2024, was deliberated by a subcommittee of the ruling party and the Ministry of Health, Labour and Welfare. Later that month, the policy to allow non-prescription pharmacy sales was approved, under the condition that the medication be taken in the presence of a pharmacist, with no age restriction or requirement for parental consent. Nationwide sales were expected following a public comment process.

Meanwhile, on August 18, the same committee also approved the sale of “Cialis,” a medication for erectile dysfunction (ED), as an over-the-counter drug. Overseas, it is currently available only in certain countries, such as the United Kingdom.In connection with the launch of this drug, an interview with Kazuko Fukuda (social activist), who followed in the footsteps of women who had suffered sexual violence at the hands of teachers who had used the erectile dysfunction drug Viagra, recounted the history of the approval of the low-dose birth control pill—a process that lagged behind other countries by nearly 40 years compared to the approval of Viagra within a few months, and which was finally approved only after North Korea and Japan remained the only countries where it was still unapproved.

Starting in February 2026, it became possible to purchase emergency contraception at pharmacies without a prescription, provided it is taken in the presence of a pharmacist.

=== Barriers to abortion ===
Under Japan's Maternal Protection Act, abortion is permitted up to 22 weeks of pregnancy, and spousal consent is required on the consent form. Even in cases involving unmarried women, some hospitals request the partner's consent, placing responsibility on male partners to sign the consent form. This system has been criticized by lawyers because it can require the consent of a perpetrator in cases of sexual assault.

In Aichi Prefecture, a 21-year-old woman exceeded the legal abortion limit while attempting to obtain consent from an unreachable partner, gave birth in a park restroom, failed to provide appropriate medical care and abandoned the body. She was sentenced to three years' imprisonment, suspended for five years. As of 2022, only 11 countries worldwide require spousal consent for abortion, including Japan, Syria, Yemen, Saudi Arabia, Kuwait, Equatorial Guinea, the United Arab Emirates, Taiwan, Indonesia, Turkey and Morocco. South Korea abolished the requirement in 2020.

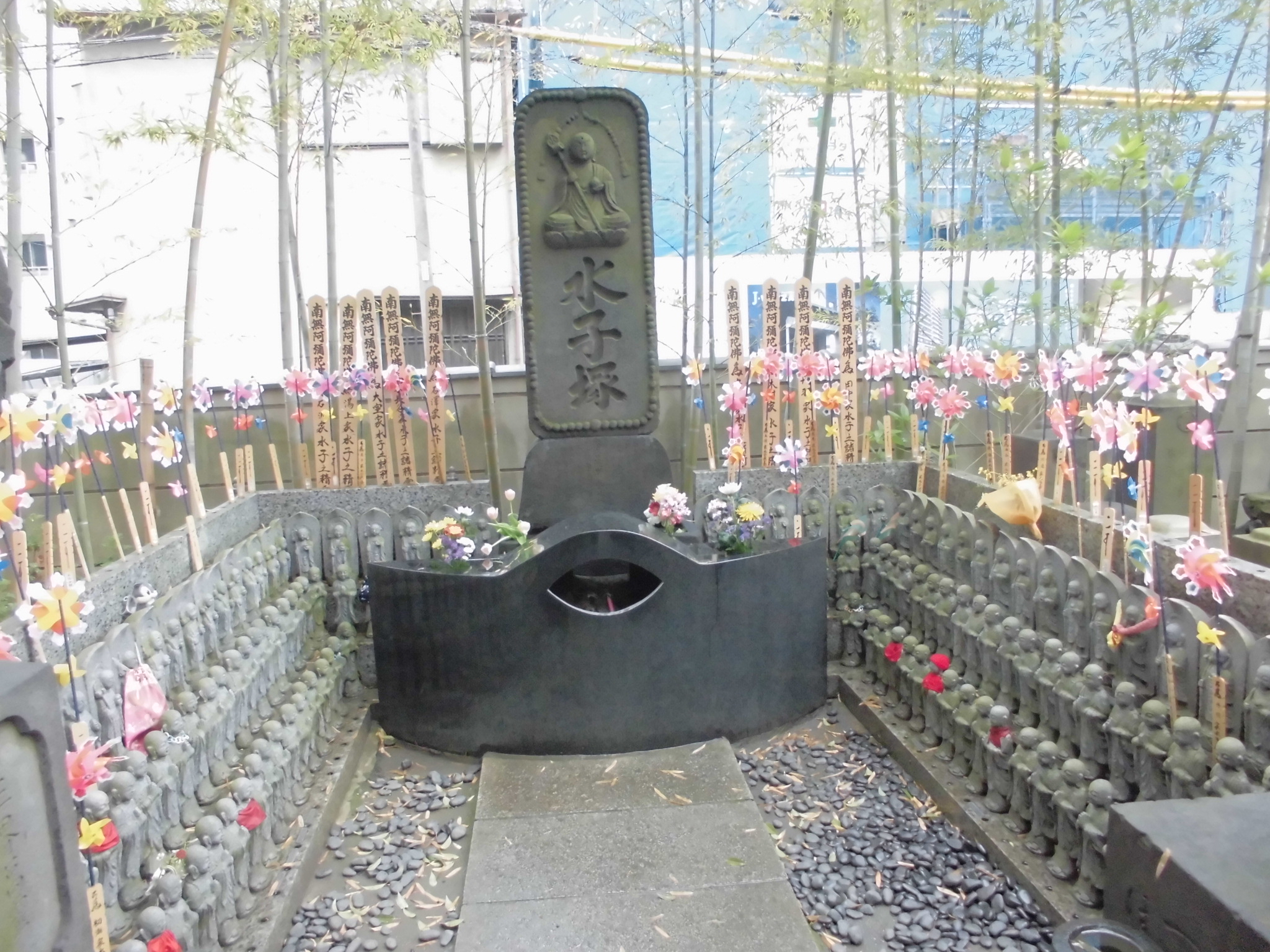
Ekoin-Mizuko-kuyoto

The concept of memorial services for miscarried or stillborn children took shape amid the commercialized campaigns that began in the mid-1970s; these services became an important source of income for temples facing a decline in parishioners and evolved into a business that capitalized on women’s feelings of guilt.

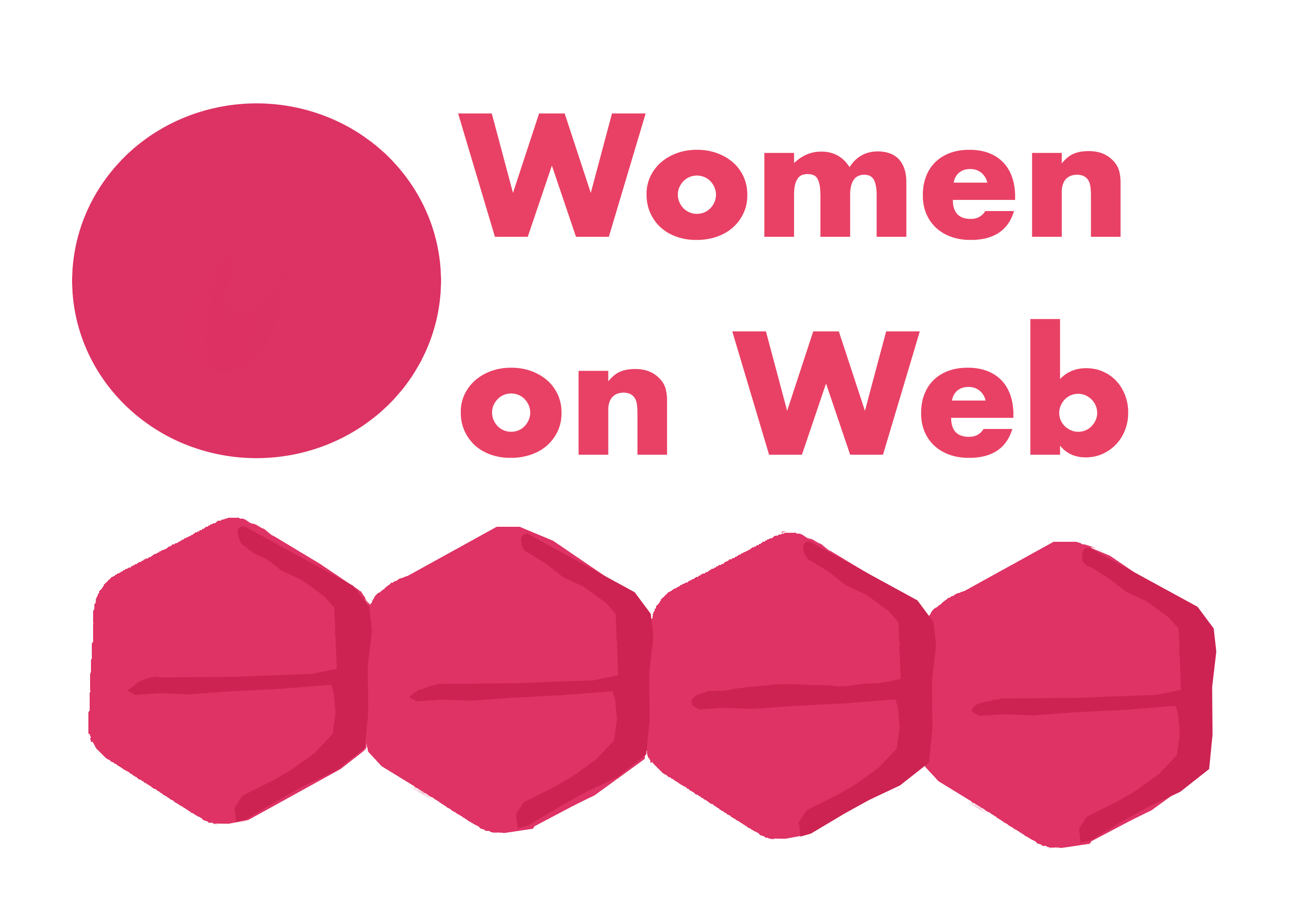
Womenonweb

“Women on Web” (WoW), a Canadian nonprofit organization, ships abortion pills and emergency contraception to people around the world. However, in Japan, the abortion medication Mepigo Pack was approved domestically in 2023. As a result, the Ministry of Health, Labor and Welfare’s official website states that, since an alternative medication is now available domestically, the personal importation of oral abortion medications containing mifepristone—including products from other companies—is, in principle, no longer permitted. Since Mepigo Pack is intended for use under the supervision of a registered, designated physician, administration must be carried out strictly in accordance with the physician’s instructions.。

=== Aversion to recording births in the family registry ===
It has been noted that some young women seeking special adoption or confidential birth perceive the recording of childbirth in the family registry as "tainting" their own or their partner's registry.

=== Lack of paternal accountability ===
Organizations supporting pregnant women report consultations from women distressed by partners who disappeared after being informed of the pregnancy, indicating a lack of paternal responsibility. Critics have pointed out that men who cause pregnancies are rarely held accountable. Psychiatrist Koya Okino has stated that the ability of fathers to abandon responsibility is a major issue.

The book Ejaculation Responsibility: A Whole New Way to Think About Abortion by American blogger Gabrielle Blair, a New York Times bestseller, was published in Japan in 2023 and attracted significant attention. The author argues that unintended pregnancy occurs only when men ejaculate irresponsibly, and that exposing women's lives to risk for fleeting pleasure is commonplace. Scholars have evaluated the work as significant for shifting focus to men who refuse to cooperate in contraception.

Among notable cases in Japan, there are instances where unwanted pregnancies result from sexual abuse by family members, such as the father. For example, a woman who was forced to live with her father as if they were husband and wife gave birth to several of his children and ultimately killed him in order to escape him.(see Tochigi patricide case)

== Foreign workers ==
Among technical intern trainees, cases of sexual violence have been reported, including unwanted touching by care recipients and coercion by employers. Fear of forced repatriation due to pregnancy has led some to conceal pregnancies, resulting in cases such as the Vietnamese technical intern isolated childbirth incident. Disparities in contraceptive options between trainees’ home countries and Japan have also been highlighted.

There is also a Vietnamese father who was arrested in June 2023 for abandoning his stillborn infant on a riverbank. He told reporters that he only learned about Japan’s burial procedures and other related matters afterward.。

In February 2024, the mother—a 19-year-old technical intern from Indonesia who was arrested on suspicion of killing her child after giving birth at a nursing facility—was referred by the family court to the public prosecutor’s office, as criminal punishment was deemed appropriate.。That same month, the 20-year-old mother of a technical intern from Vietnam was arrested and charged with placing the body of her stillborn baby boy in a plastic bag and abandoning it in a trash can. She reportedly heard repeatedly from her supervising organization and others that “if she became pregnant, she would be sent back to her home country.” However, her boyfriend testified that she had also been instructed not to disclose this information to anyone.。It was reported that in May 2026, a 21-year-old female office worker of Indonesian nationality was arrested in Fukaya City, Saitama Prefecture, on suspicion of abandoning a body after giving birth at home, and that she stated she believed she would be forcibly deported if she had a child.。In August of that same year, a 21-year-old female vocational student from Myanmar was arrested in Higashimatsuyama City for abandoning the body of an infant indoors.

== Penalties ==
If there was no intent to cause death, Article 205 of the Penal Code (bodily injury resulting in death) or Article 219 (abandonment by a person responsible resulting in death) may apply. Abandoning or concealing a body may result in prosecution under Article 190 (abandonment of a corpse).

== Countermeasures ==
The non-profit organization Florence has operated a "free maternity hospital" program since 2023, designating Daini Adachi Hospital in Kyoto to fully subsidize childbirth costs for economically disadvantaged women and to provide support including special adoption when childcare is not possible. As of July 2025, the program was being implemented at four hospitals across three prefectures—Gifu, Kyoto, and Wakayama—using donated funds.

San-ikukai Hospital

Hospitals offering confidential birth in Japan are limited to two locations: Jikei Hospital in Kumamoto City and San-ikukai Hospital in Sumida, Tokyo. A man who was placed in the "Stork's Cradle" baby hatch at around the age of three has publicly stated under his real name that the system saved his life and now gives lectures about his experience.

In an interview with the Tokyo Shimbun, Director Hitoshi Kato of San-ikukai Hospital stated that some consultation cases involve survivors of sexual violence, and emphasized the need for support for impoverished single mothers, improved sex education, and addressing issues such as prostitution, while calling for responsible behavior by men. He also pointed out that misogyny lies at the root of these issues and criticized a society that fails to provide adequate support. Because San-ikukai Hospital's policy is, in principle, to charge the woman for childbirth costs, Director Hasuda of Jikei Hospital stated that, in cases where a woman is unable to pay and might otherwise forgo confidential birth, Jikei Hospital would act as a proxy and cover the costs upon request.

Under Article 22 of the Child Welfare Act, prefectures, municipalities, and towns with welfare offices are obligated to subsidize hospitalization and childbirth costs upon application by pregnant women who are unable to afford them for economic reasons. In August 2019, the Ministry of Health, Labour and Welfare issued a notice encouraging awareness and smooth implementation of this institutional midwifery system. The Japan Association of Obstetricians and Gynecologists also notified its members to promote utilization of the system in cooperation with local governments. Facilities known as "mother-and-child living support facilities", which allow both mother and child to reside together, exist throughout Japan.

== See also ==
- Harm reduction
- Baby hatch
- Coin-operated-locker babies
