= General Hospital of Paris =

Former hospital in France

The General Hospital of Paris (French: Hôpital général de Paris) was an Ancien Régime institution intended as a place of confinement of the poor. Formed by a royal edict during the reign of Louis XIV, it aimed to address the recurring problem of begging and the Cour des miracles, as well as to house invalids. The General Hospital's authority stretched beyond its premises to include all the poor in Paris.

The hospital serves as a major point of analysis in philosopher Michel Foucault's seminal work, Madness and Civilization.

== Founding ==
Like the other western European states, France dealt with an increase in mendicancy beginning in the sixteenth century. This increase fueled anxiety about maintaining social stability and motivated the creation of more severe penalties for begging, such as branding, whipping, and forced labor. In the years prior to the establishment of the General Hospital, the devastation of the Fronde resulted in a particularly large influx of beggars into Paris. The growing population of beggars was approximately 40,000 people, many of whom were refugees impoverished during the wars. This amount would have constituted roughly 10% of the Parisian population.

To alleviate such destitution, in 1652 the Company of the Blessed Sacrament, an active French Catholic secret society, started relief efforts centered around the development of a charitable storehouse. However, after the wars' conclusion, the company decided to advocate for a policy of confinement, a more long-term solution to the city's poverty and mendicancy. The company had taken an interest in confining the Parisian poor ever since 1633, impressed by apparent successes of the first General Hospital in Lyon. However, this proposed solution also had precedents within the city itself. For instance, from 1612 to 1618, the Hôpital des Pauvres Enfermés—an early attempt at building a Parisian general hospital—locked up local beggars and subjected them to a system of forced labor. However, this effort was short-lived due to financial difficulties, political conflicts, and a sharp increase in the refugee population, among other challenges. Later on, in 1632, the Parlement of Paris again began to apprehend beggars, this time using them as forced laborers for the city sewers.

Consequently, the idea of confinement had already been introduced when Christophe du Plessis-Montbard, a devoted member of the Company of the Blessed Sacrament, began to work with the Parliament in 1653 on developing plans for a new Parisian general hospital. Also instrumental in shaping these plans were Les Dames de la Charité, an organization of wealthy lay women led at the time by Marie Madeleine d’Aiguillon. The General Hospital of Paris was ultimately established three years later in 1656 by a royal edict of Louis XIV. The hospital was endowed not just with authority on its own premises, but also with jurisdiction over all the poor residents of the city.

Michel Foucault identifies the founding of the Parisian General Hospital as a key moment in the continent-wide trend towards confining the poor. Similar establishments were founded during the same time period in modern-day Switzerland, United Kingdom, Poland, Germany, Russia, and Ireland.

== Operations ==
=== Facilities ===
The Parisian General Hospital was structured as a consolidation of a number of existing institutions under shared mission and management. These establishments initially included the Maison de Saint-Louis de Salpêtrière, Maison de Saint-Jean de Bicêtre, Notre Dame de La Pitié, La Savonnerie, and Scipion. However, Maison du Saint-Esprit and the Enfants-Trouvés were soon added and Savonnerie dropped. In 1670, a royal edict also added the Foundling Hospital, to house abandoned children. By 1680, the General Hospital had expanded to encompass a total of nine different institutions. Many of the hospital's constituent institutions had previously served as charities for different indigent groups.

Although the General Hospital was not a medical facility, a resident physician was hired to make regular visits to the various constituent institutions. Eventually, beginning in 1780, physician Jean Colombier began to introduce a substantial expansion to the hospital's medical apparatus in his capacity as the royally-appointed inspector of hospitals and prisons. He created facilities staffed with medical personnel at Salpêtrière and Bicêtre. Beginning at an earlier time, the General Hospital also contributed to medical research by a confidential arrangement whereby dead prisoners from Salpêtrière could by used by researchers at the Royal Garden of the Medicinal Plants as cadavers (French: Jardin royal des plantes médicinales).

=== Management ===
Although the project of the General Hospital had been developed by the Parliament, in practice the hospital was much more closely tied with royal power. The Company of the Blessed Sacrament was also instrumental in the running of the General Hospital: twelve out of the twenty-six directors for life appointed by a May 4, 1656 royal edict were members of the company. The administrative board was shared with the Hôtel-Dieu, Paris' other major hospital. The board's membership consisted of key governmental figures ranging from the President of the Parliament and the Archbishop of Paris to the Lieutenant General of Police. Beneath this board was another committee (specifically for the General Hospital) consisting of layman. The hospital's day-to-day oversight, however, was undertaken by Les Dames de la Charité through a lay sisterhood headed by Marie Bonneau de Rubelle, Mme de Miramion.

After the French Revolution begun, a December 1789 decree of the National Constituent Assembly charged relevant governmental departments with the oversight of Parisian hospitals, charitable houses, prisons, and related institutions, consolidating their administrations under a single authority. In April 1791, the Paris hospitals (including the General Hospital) were all placed under the management of a five-member committee, abolishing their individual administrations.

=== Financing ===
It was initially decided that the hospital would be financed in large part by donations. This budgeting structure would later cause financial problems during the seventeenth and the eighteenth centuries, as the hospital's increasing population of inmates generated increasing expenses. This reliance on donations also meant that the hospital's policies were sometimes shaped by the will of its donors, especially in areas of religion. For example, during the institution's founding, the Les Dames de la Charité threatened to withhold their donations unless members of the Daughters of Charity (French: Filles de la Charité) were guaranteed placements at the hospital. Even though the founding committee was opposed to involving religious orders in the hospital's administration, ultimately the Daughters of Charity received their positions.

Another notable source of funding was various fines and taxes, many of which were established as revenue streams from the time of the hospital's founding. For instance, until the revolution an octroi tax on wine and liquors generated substantial revenues for the General Hospital and the Foundling Hospital (whose finances were kept separate from the rest of the General Hospital). Revenues raised from fines on rule violations at the Parisian bourse also contributed to the hospital's funding.

Another financing challenge originated in the fact that—unlike French general hospitals—the Parisian General Hospital was obligated to confine many "foreign" inmates who were not from the city itself. For example, after a 1662 famine, the hospital was forced to double its debt to accommodate the expenses associated with the increase of inmates from the surrounding area. In order to save money, these nearby towns and cities were sending their indigent residents to their capital. To help reduce strain on the capital, a royal edict was issued instructing all French towns and villages to create their own general hospitals. In 1676, a similar edict aimed at all cities and large towns was issued.

The administrative re-structuring after the French Revolution eliminated some of the hospital's important revenue streams, beginning a period of financial decline.

=== Population ===
Incarceration began on Monday, May 14, 1657, when the militia—popularly referred to as the "archers of the poor"—began arresting beggars and delivering them to the General Hospital. By its first year, the Hospital General held 6,000 poor, which made up around one percent of the population. Most of its inhabitants were voluntary inmates such as orphaned children, the elderly, or the sick. Even these voluntary inmates, however, were subject to a level of coercion. As for involuntary inmates, the hospital only had room to confine a few hundred particularly persistent beggars. This would become a lasting trend in the hospital's demographics: even though one of the hospital's primary aims was to imprison pauvres valides—immoral or mendicant poor people nonetheless capable of work—most of its space would be used to house pauvres invalides—those too old, young, or sick to support themselves. Most of the pauvres valides were housed at Salpêtrière and Bicêtre, although eventually these areas for criminals were done away with: in 1795 at the former institution, and in 1836 at the latter. There was also a small number of political prisoners held at the hospital.

By the early eighteenth century, the population of the General Hospital usually numbered around 8,000 to 9,000 people. By the latter half of that century, the population had grown substantially: in 1786, the hospital's constituent institutions held 12,000 individuals, and oversaw an additional 15,000 foundlings not housed within its walls.

Salpêtrière housed 1,460 a population of women and young children four years after the hospital's founding. Over time the population significantly increased, with a census from May 1713 counting a population of 4,079 inmates. This population was around 80% pauvres invalides such as children, insane women, elderly married couples, mothers, pregnant women, and sick women. Around 20% were pauvres valides such as female beggars or vagrants. Before the revolution, Salpêtrière's population had grown to 10,000, divided among fifteen separate buildings including prisons for criminals and prostitutes, a madhouse, a girl's reformatory, and a poorhouse.

Bicêtre held 1,313 inmates at the time of the May 1713 census. The division was similar to that of Salpêtrière: 74% of inmates were pauvres invalides such as physically or mentally disabled men, blind beggars, and sufferers of syphilis; 26% were pauvres valides such as male beggars, criminals, and vagrants.

Children also composed a significant portion of the hospital's population, even apart from the 15,000 foundlings housed outside of it. By 1786, four of the hospital's institutions were populated entirely by orphans and foundlings. Beginning in 1680, disobedient or licentious children were also sent by their parents to live in reformaries at Salpêtrière and Bicêtre.

=== Operations ===
Seeing as the General Hospital had authority over all the poor of Paris, the hospital’s directors were endowed with punitive powers paralleling the courts: according to the founding edict, directors had the power to utilize "stakes, irons, prisons, and dungeons in the said Hôpital Général and the places thereto appertaining so much as they deem necessary, no appeal will be accepted from the regulations they establish within the said hospital."

Within the General Hospital, the daily lives of the poor were meticulously regulated. There was a dress code of assigned grey robes and caps, and their daily routines of work, prayer, and meals were tightly scheduled. By the eighteenth century, the General Hospital employed a permanent staff of roughly five hundred. Although everyday life was orderly, living conditions could be unsanitary. A 1790 committee from the National Constituent Assembly found Salpêtrière and Pitié to be overcrowded and foul-smelling, with many inmates suffering from conditions such as ringworm and itch.

Work was a key component of everyday life at the General Hospital for both punitive and reformative reasons. Inmates were made to labor in workshops, participating in tasks such as knitting, spinning, and weaving. Refusal to work resulted in physically intensive labor assignments at Bicêtre. This system did not bring economic benefits to the institution; on the contrary, it was a major expense undertaken for the sake of moral instruction and reform. However, the administration of the General Hospital unsuccessfully tried on many occasions to make the establishment more profitable by turning buildings such as Pitié and Bicêtre into factories for tasks such as lace manufacturing and mirror polishing.

The young foundlings living outside of the hospital's walls worked as well, many of them living on farms in rural areas. Once they got older, they either continued with farm work or returned to the hospital until adulthood. If they returned, girls would learn housekeeping skills and boys would be afforded apprenticeships with Paris' guilds and corporations, an arrangement dating from the hospital's founding.

By the eighteenth century, however, the workshops were in decline.

== Cultural references ==
The General Hospital of Paris is a major point of analysis in Michel Foucault's seminal work Madness and Civilization: A History of Insanity in the Age of Reason.
