= Noboru Kikuta =

Japanese gynecologist

Noboru Kikuta (菊田昇) (May 31, 1926 – August 21, 1991) was a Japanese gynecologist. He is best known for circumventing Japanese adoption law in the 1970's by falsifying birth certificates so that children could be adopted anonymously.

== Early life and education ==
Kikuta was born in Ishinomaki, Japan on May 31, 1926. He graduated from Tohoku University in 1949. He did his residency at the Tohoku University Hospital, then earned a doctorate there. He worked at Akita City Hospital for a while, then opened a clinic in his hometown of Ishinomaki.

== Career ==
Early in his career, Kikuta performed many abortions. The koseki law at the time made the idea of adopting infants unattractive to prospective parents because the adoption would be recorded on the koseki, and the child could easily find out about the adoption and their birth parents, and suffer the stigma of being adopted. Pregnant women would instead give their newborns to midwives, who would find a family to adopt the child "off the books", recording the child as their own on the koseki. Physicians were required to fill out a birth certificate, making it impossible for a child to be adopted in the way in which midwives could carry this out.

Kikuta created false birth certificates in order to circumvent the law, and had arranged 100 adoptions. This fact was discovered in 1973, when he put advertisements in local newspapers looking for people to adopt children and raise them as their own. His medical license was revoked. He appealed the revocation, but the court maintained that his action could have created a gray market in babies, and caused people to lose faith in the integrity of the koseki system.

Kikuta proposed changes to the koseki and adoption laws such as listing adoptive parents rather than birth parents on the child's koseki, allowing both parties to maintain their anonymity. He also proposed not allowing abortions after the seventh month of pregnancy. The movement caused by his actions and proposed changes to abortion laws eventually failed; a new special adoption law that recorded adopted children in the same way as birth children passed in 1987.

He also converted to Christianity in 1987. He was interested in the religion as a medical student, but did not practice it after he had a disagreement with a pastor. He started to change his mind after meeting Mother Teresa and Shigeki Chiba in 1981, and being approached by Kenzo Tsujioka in 1985.

Kikuta was awarded the International Right to Life Federation’s Award for Life in April 1991. He died on August 21, 1991.
