= Bicêtre Hospital =

Hospital in Paris, France

- AP-HP
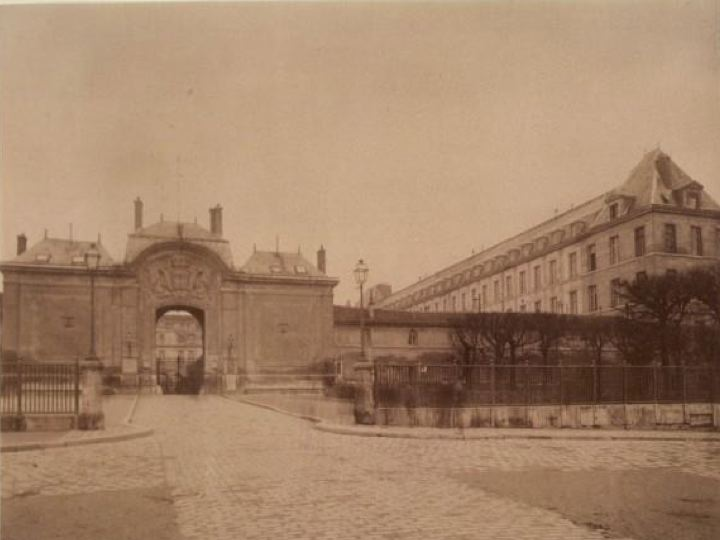
- Main entrance on Général Leclerc Street in 1901

Geography
- Location: Le Kremlin-Bicêtre, Paris, France
- Coordinates: 48°48′36″N 02°21′22″E

Organisation
- Type: General

Services
- Emergency department: Yes
- Beds: 301

History
- Former names: Asylum de Bicêtre, Hospice de la Vieillesse Hommes, Military Hospital
- Opened: 1742

Links
- Website: hopital-bicetre.aphp.fr
- Lists: Hospitals in France

The Bicêtre Hospital is located in Le Kremlin-Bicêtre, a commune in the southern suburbs of Paris, France. It lies 4.5 km (2.8 miles) from the center of Paris. The Bicêtre Hospital was originally planned as a military hospital, with construction begun in 1634. With the help of Vincent de Paul, it was finally opened as an orphanage in 1642. It was incorporated into the Hôpital Général de Paris in 1656. In 1823, it was called the Hospice de la Vieillesse Hommes. In 1885, it was renamed the Hospice de Bicêtre.

== History ==
In its history it has been used successively and simultaneously as an orphanage, a prison, a lunatic asylum, and a hospital. Its most notorious guest was the Marquis de Sade. In 1781 the prison was referred to as "much more terrible than the Bastille".

The Bicêtre is most famous as the Asylum de Bicêtre where Superintendent Philippe Pinel is credited as being the first to introduce humane methods into the treatment of the mentally ill, in 1793.

The Bicêtre is referenced in the last chapter of Foucault's Madness and Civilisation titled "The Birth of the Asylum." In it, Pinel's methods are classified as more devious than humane.

== See also ==
- Pitié-Salpêtrière Hospital
