= Baby hatch =

Device for transfer of unwanted infants

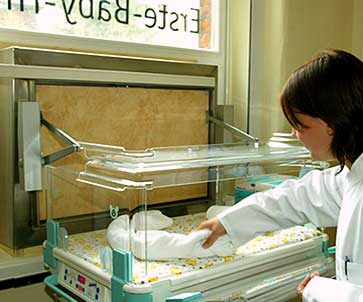
Baby hatch in Germany

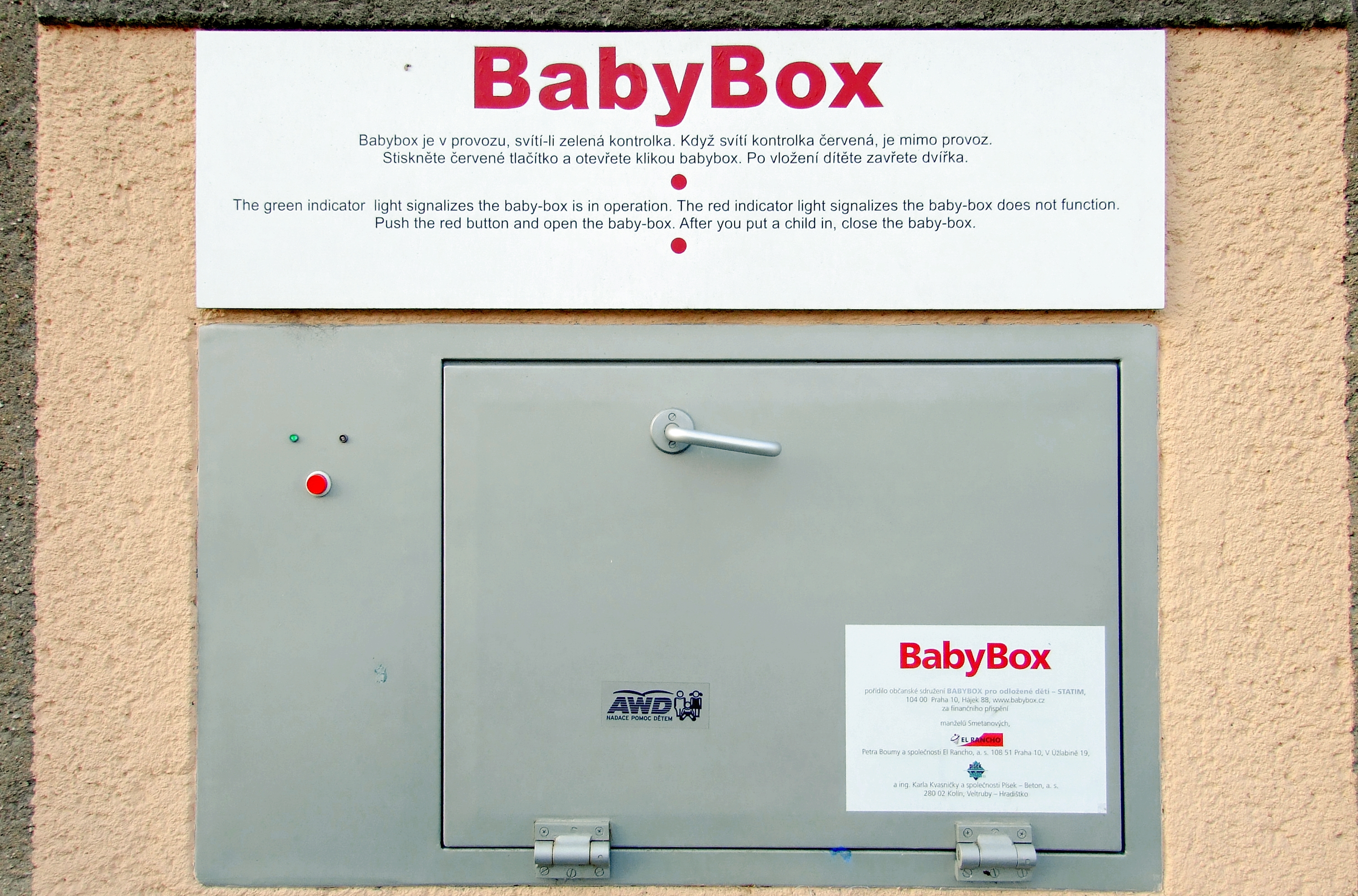
Baby hatch called "BabyBox" in the Czech Republic

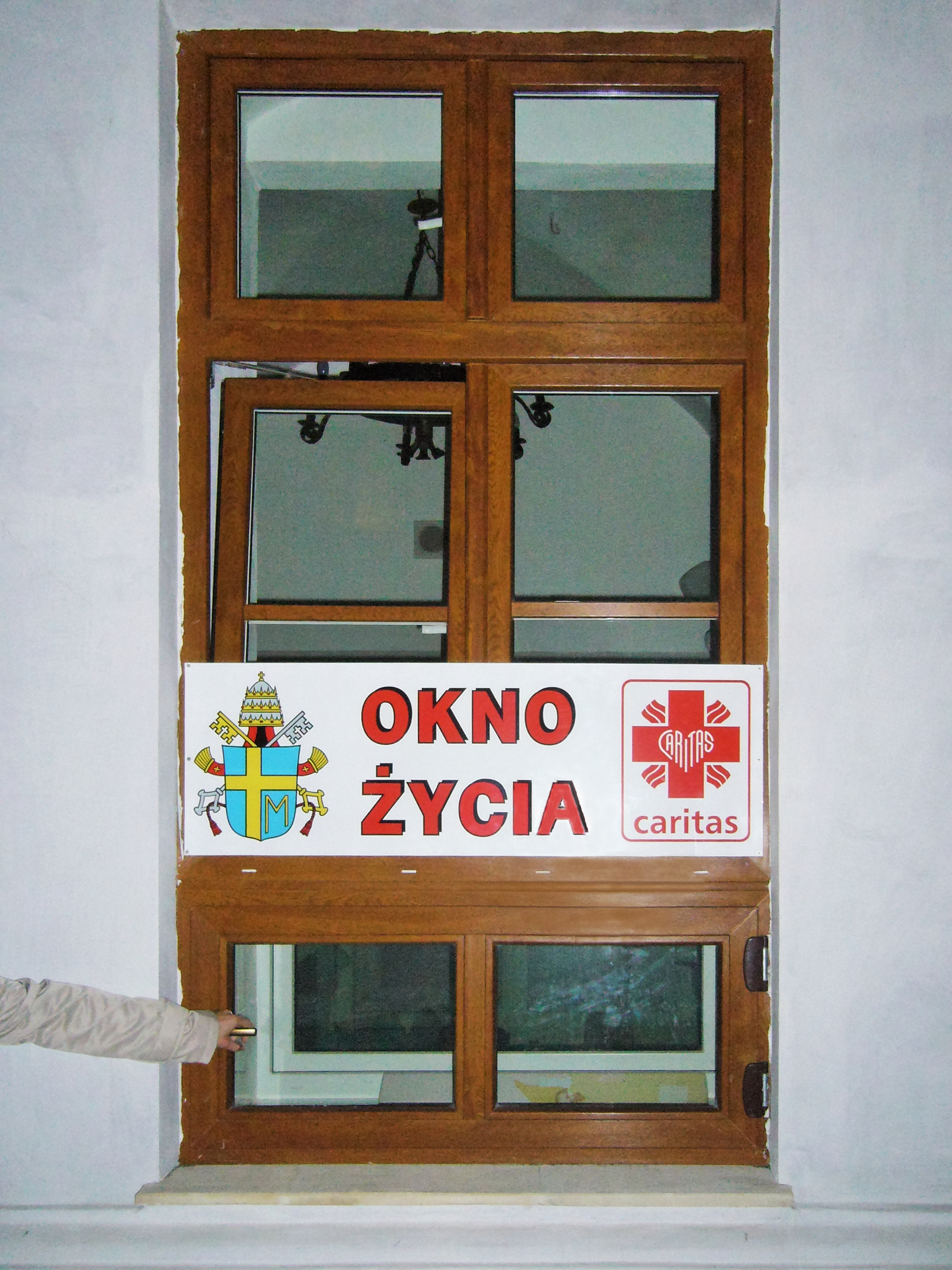
Baby hatch in Poland. The label OKNO ŻYCIA means 'Window of Life'

A baby hatch or baby box is a place where people (typically mothers) can leave babies, usually newborn, anonymously in a safe place to be found and cared for. This was common from the Middle Ages to the 18th and 19th centuries, when the device was known as a foundling wheel. Foundling wheels were abandoned in the late 19th century, but a modern form, the baby hatch, was reintroduced from 1952 and since 2000 has been adopted in many countries, most notably in Pakistan where there are more than 300. They can also be found in Germany (100), the United States (150), Czech Republic (88), Poland (67), Austria (16), Belgium (1) and Japan (2).

The hatches are usually in hospitals, social centres, or churches, and consist of a door or flap in an outside wall which opens onto a heated or insulated soft bed. Sensors in modern beds issue an alert when a baby has been placed in it. In Germany, babies are looked after for eight weeks during which the parent can return and claim the child without any legal repercussions. If this does not happen, the child is considered available for adoption.

== History ==
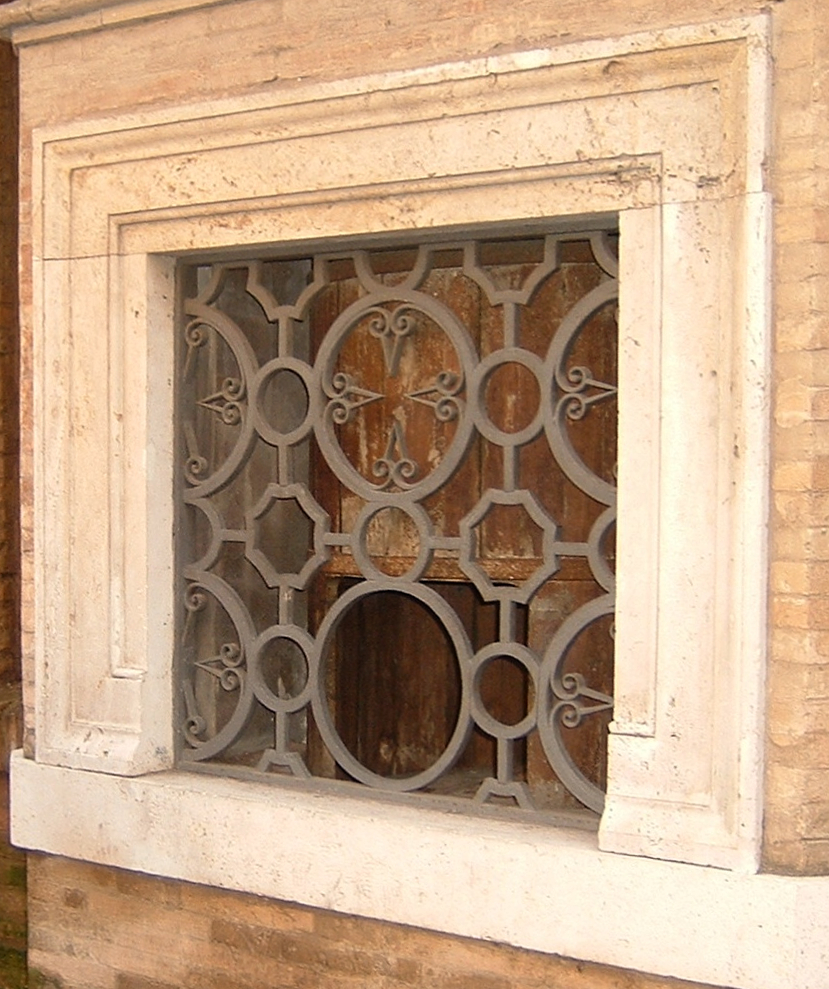
Foundling wheel at the Ospedale di Santo Spirito in Rome

Baby hatches have existed in one form or another for centuries. The system was quite common in medieval times. From 1198 the first foundling wheels (ruota dei trovatelli) were used in Italy; Pope Innocent III decreed that these should be installed in homes for foundlings so that women could leave their child in secret instead of abandoning or killing them, a practice clearly evident from the numerous drowned infants found in the Tiber River. A foundling wheel was a cylinder set upright in the outside wall of the building, rather like a revolving door. Mothers placed the child in the cylinder, turned it around so that the baby was inside the church, and then rang a bell to alert caretakers. One example of this type which can still be seen today is in the Santo Spirito hospital at the Vatican City; this wheel was installed in medieval times and used until the 19th century. Another foundling wheel dating to at least 1601 is on display for visitors to Naples' Church of the Annunciata.

In Hamburg, Germany, a Dutch merchant set up a wheel (Drehladen) in an orphanage in 1709. It closed after only five years in 1714 as the number of babies left there was too high for the orphanage to cope with financially. Other wheels are known to have existed in Kassel (1764) and Mainz (1811).

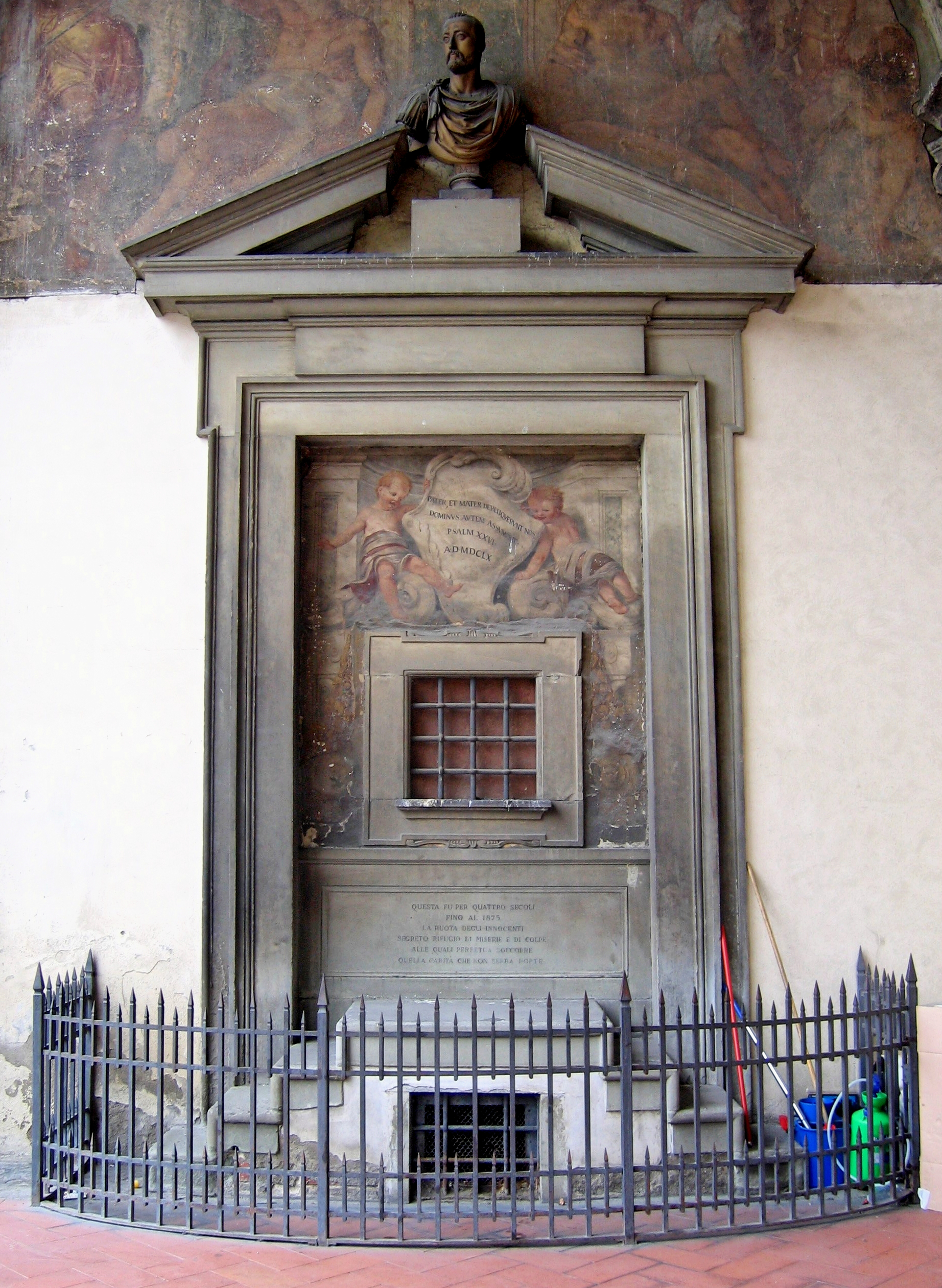
Foundling wheel at the Ospedale degli Innocenti in Florence

In France, foundling wheels (tour d'abandon, abandonment wheel) were introduced by Saint Vincent de Paul who built the first foundling home in 1638 in Paris. A rotating wooden window allowed an infant to be placed (sometimes with a note or an identification sign in the form of a necklace) from the outside without the mother being visible and it would be turned in by the caretakers to take hold of the infant. One in five infants in early 19th century France was abandoned. Foundling wheels were legalised in an imperial decree of January 19, 1811, and at their height, there were 251 in France, according to author Anne Martin-Fugier. They were in hospitals such as the Hôpital des Enfants-Trouvés (Hospital for Foundling Children) in Paris. However, the number of children left there rose into the tens of thousands per year, as a result of the desperate economic situation at the time, and in 1863 they were closed down and replaced by "admissions offices" where mothers could give up their child anonymously but could also receive advice. The tours d'abandon were officially abolished in law of June 27, 1904. Today in France, women are allowed to give birth anonymously in hospitals (accouchement sous X) and leave their baby there.

In Brazil and Portugal, foundling wheels (roda dos expostos/enjeitados, literally 'wheel for exposed/rejected ones') were also used after Queen Maria I proclaimed on May 24, 1783, that all towns should have a foundling hospital. One example was the wheel installed at the Santa Casa de Misericordia hospital in São Paulo on July 2, 1825. This was taken out of use on June 5, 1949, declared incompatible with the modern social system after five years' debate.

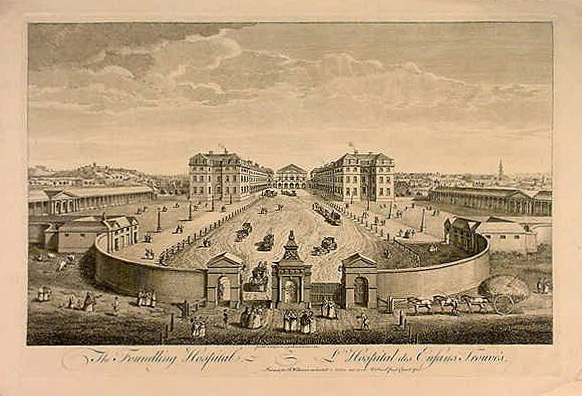
Foundling Hospital in London

In Britain and Ireland, foundlings were brought up in orphanages financed by the Poor Tax. The home for foundlings in London was established in 1741; in Dublin the Foundling Hospital and Workhouse installed a foundling wheel in 1730, as this excerpt from the Minute Book of the Court of Governors of that year shows:

"Hu (Boulter) Armach, Primate of All-Ireland, being in the chair, ordered that a turning-wheel, or convenience for taking in children, be provided near the gate of the workhouse; that at any time, by day or by night, a child may be layd in it, to be taken in by the officers of the said house."

The foundling wheel in Dublin was taken out of use in 1826 when the Dublin hospital was closed because of the high death rate of children there.

== Modern examples ==
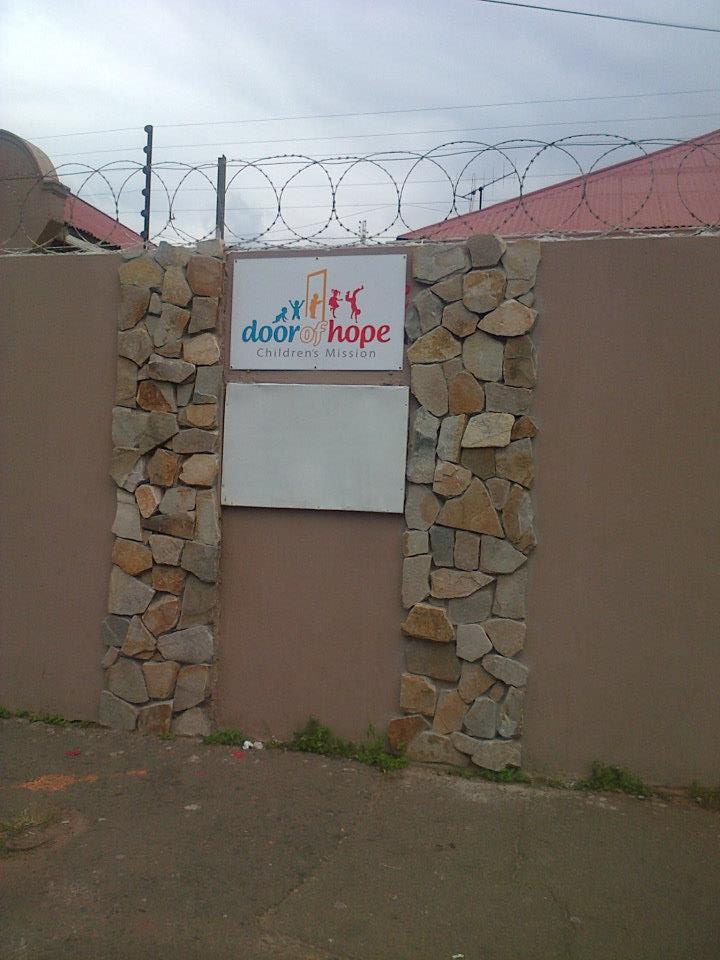
Door of Hope Children's Mission, Johannesburg

A baby hatch was installed by Door of Hope Children's Mission (Hole in the Wall) in Johannesburg, South Africa in 1999 after the pastor, Cheryl Allen, learned that a high number of newly born infants were abandoned. Pastor Allen realised that many of those desperate women and girls may well have acted differently if there had been an alternative. The church made a hole in their wall and a "baby bin" was installed allowing for mothers to leave their babies any time, day or night. The moment a baby is placed in the "baby bin" care workers on duty receive an electronic signal alerting them. The baby is taken in and the anonymity of the "donor" ensured. Baby M was the first baby that came through the "baby bin", arriving on 3 October 1999. By 2013, Door of Hope had received over 1300 babies. 148 came through the "baby bin" but most come from hospitals, police or community members and some babies have even been brought personally by the mothers.

Another modern baby hatch was installed in the Altona district of Hamburg, Germany on 11 April 2000, after a series of cases in 1999 where children were abandoned and found dead from exposure. It consisted of a warm bed in which the child could be placed from outside the building. After a short delay to allow the person who left the child to leave anonymously, a silent alarm was set off which alerted staff. By 2010, 38 babies had been left in the Findelbaby baby hatch in Hamburg, 14 of whom were later reclaimed by their mothers.

The Edhi Foundation in Pakistan offers a similar system.

Baby boxes are becoming more widespread in the United States after the 2022 Supreme Court decision Dobbs v. Jackson Women's Health Organization allowed states to prohibit abortion.

== Reasons for using baby hatches ==
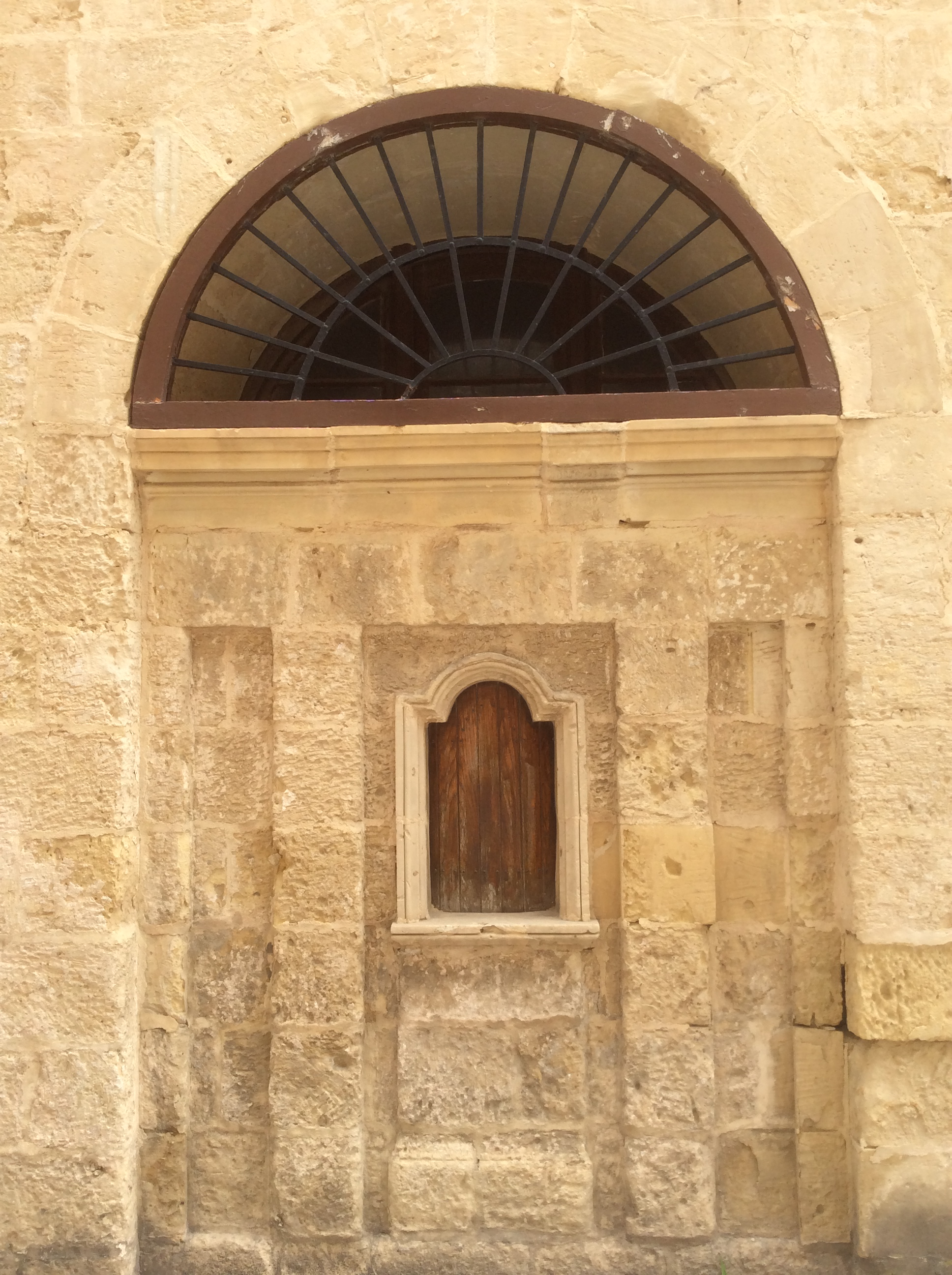
Baby hatch in Rabat, Malta

One reason many babies have been abandoned, especially in the past, was that they were born out of wedlock. In modern times, baby hatches are more often intended to be used by mothers who are unable to cope with looking after their own child and do not wish to divulge their identity. In some countries, it is not legal for mothers to give birth anonymously in a hospital, and the baby hatch is the only way they can safely and secretly leave their child to be cared for by others. In India and Pakistan, the purpose of baby hatches is mainly to provide an alternative to female infanticide, which occurs due to socioeconomic factors including the high cost of dowries.

== Opposition and legal issues ==
Some issues with baby hatches are connected to children's right to know their own identity, as guaranteed by the UN Convention on the Rights of the Child's Article 8. Another problem is that the anonymous person who drops off the infant may not have the legal right to do so, perhaps without the permission of the mother. Also, in some places baby hatches may be overwhelmed by the abandonment of sick and disabled children.

Not all countries have safe-haven laws allowing for babies to be left in designated safe areas, so it can be legally risky for a mother to surrender her baby in a baby hatch.

Those opposed to baby hatches argue that hatches do not save babies' lives, instead encouraging further abandonment by mothers rather than finding other solutions and representing a state's dereliction of duty to create social programs which might reduce child abandonment. Several European countries have passed laws allowing for anonymous birth in hospitals, sometimes free of charge, to prevent the risks associated with an unassisted delivery and to provide medical care during the birth.

== Countries ==
=== Austria ===
In Austria, the law treats babies found in baby hatches as foundlings. The local social services office for children and young people (Jugendwohlfahrt) takes care of the child for the first six months, and then it is given up for adoption. The first hatch was introduced in Vienna in 2000. As of 2018, there were 15 hatches in seven of the nine Austrian states, and hatches were used 30 times between 2008 and 2016. Since women have had the right to give birth anonymously in hospitals since 2001, those anonymous births have greatly outnumbered the use of baby hatches.

=== Belgium ===
In Belgium, the legal framework is absent, and abandoning babies is illegal, but in practice the babies are placed in foster care and become available for adoption after a few months. In 2000, the association Moeders voor Moeders ('Mothers for mothers') set up the first babyschuif in Antwerp. As of 2021, 18 babies have been found in the Antwerp hatch, the only one in Belgium. In 2017, another hatch was installed in Evere, Brussels, by the organization Corvia, but was banned by the mayor. Despite the Council of State overturning the ban in 2020, a new mayor of Evere again prohibited its operation in 2021.

=== Canada ===
Canada prohibits abandoning a child "so that its life is or is likely to be endangered." As of 2020, three babies have been left in hatches installed in Canada. One hatch is in Vancouver and two in Edmonton.

=== China ===
In 2011, China opened at least 25 baby hatches ("baby safety island" in Mandarin). A medical team was supposed to pick up the infant within 10 minutes. By 2015 there were 32 across the country. The first was opened in Shijiazhuang in 2011. It has by 2014 received 181 children. The estimated number of children, was officially some 1,400 a year in total, in the whole country.

The government-run orphanage in eastern China opened its first baby hatch on 1 June 2014, International Children's Day, as a symbolic step to show the country's commitment to improving child welfare. However, it since proved so popular that authorities have had to introduce new rules to limit the number of babies and children being abandoned. In just 11 days, 106 children, all with disabilities or medical conditions, were dropped off at the Jinan facility. That is more than the 85 orphans the city accepted in 2013.

Since the opening of a baby hatch in Guangzhou, it received almost 80 infants in a month. Child Welfare Centre in Guangzhou, said it had taken in 262 children in less than two months since it opened the baby hatch. All the babies – 67% of whom were less than a year old – had varying degrees of illness. More than 90% survived, 22 babies died. The baby hatch in Nanjing was "crowded with visitors". Parents were seen to drop babies off at the facility every day.

The number of babies with congenital defects has soared over the past decade, with upwards of 900,000 such cases reported each year. In addition, at least 100,000 children are abandoned each year. Most are either disabled or girls.

=== Czech Republic ===
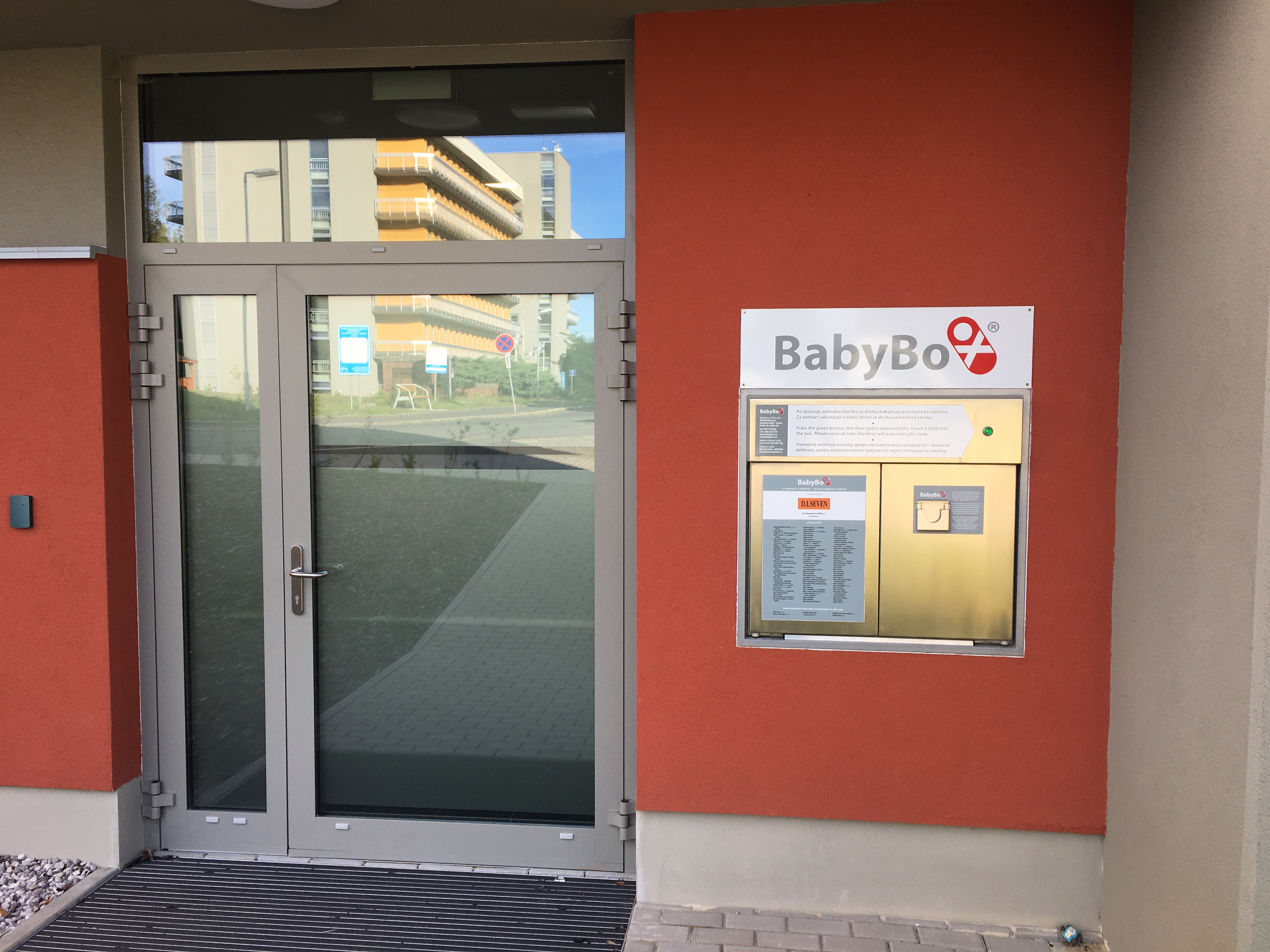
Baby hatch in Příbram, Czech Republic, 2020

In the Czech Republic, the Ministry of Social Affairs confirmed in 2006 that baby hatches (called Babybox in Czech) are legal under Czech law. In contradiction to this, in March 2006, Colonel Anna Piskova, a police officer, said on Czech television that the police would look for the mothers of abandoned children. The head of the Czech baby hatch organization Statim, Ludvik Hess, complained about this statement and was officially supported by the Save the Children Foundation.

The United Nations Committee on the Rights of the Child has questioned the legality of baby boxes, criticizing the high number of children's group homes and claiming the boxes violate children's rights in 2011. Czech internet news server novinky.cz has reported that United Nations wants to ban baby hatches in the Czech Republic.

The first baby hatch was set up in July 2005 in Prague by Babybox – Statim. In March 2006, three children had been left there. In December 2007, there were five "Babyboxes" in the republic: Prague-Hloubětín, Brno, Olomouc, Kadaň and Zlín, and the next were planned in Pelhřimov, Ústí nad Orlicí, Mladá Boleslav and Sokolov in 2008. Between 2005 and 2007, ten infants were given in baby-boxes, seven of them in Prague. Some of them returned to their mothers or were inserted with full documentation. As of December 2011 there were 47, and 62 children had already been left there; one of the baby boxes was used 13 times. 75% of the boxes have been used. As of June 2023, there are 85 baby hatches in the country, mostly in major cities and district capitals. So far, they have helped to save 253 children, with the oldest to date being the case of an almost two years old boy in 2019. The one in University Hospital Královské Vinohrady in Prague has received 30 babies and the one at Brothers of Charity Hospital in Brno 22 babies since 2005.

=== France ===
In France, the Vichy government adopted the Legislative Decree of 2 September 1941 on the Protection of Births allowing children to be born anonymously. This law, somewhat modified, became the modern right to anonymous birth (accouchement sous X) set down in the French Social Action and Families Code (Art. 222–6). It covers children up to one year of age. In 2003, the European Court of Human Rights upheld this law, ruling that it did not violate the European Convention on Human Rights.

=== Germany ===
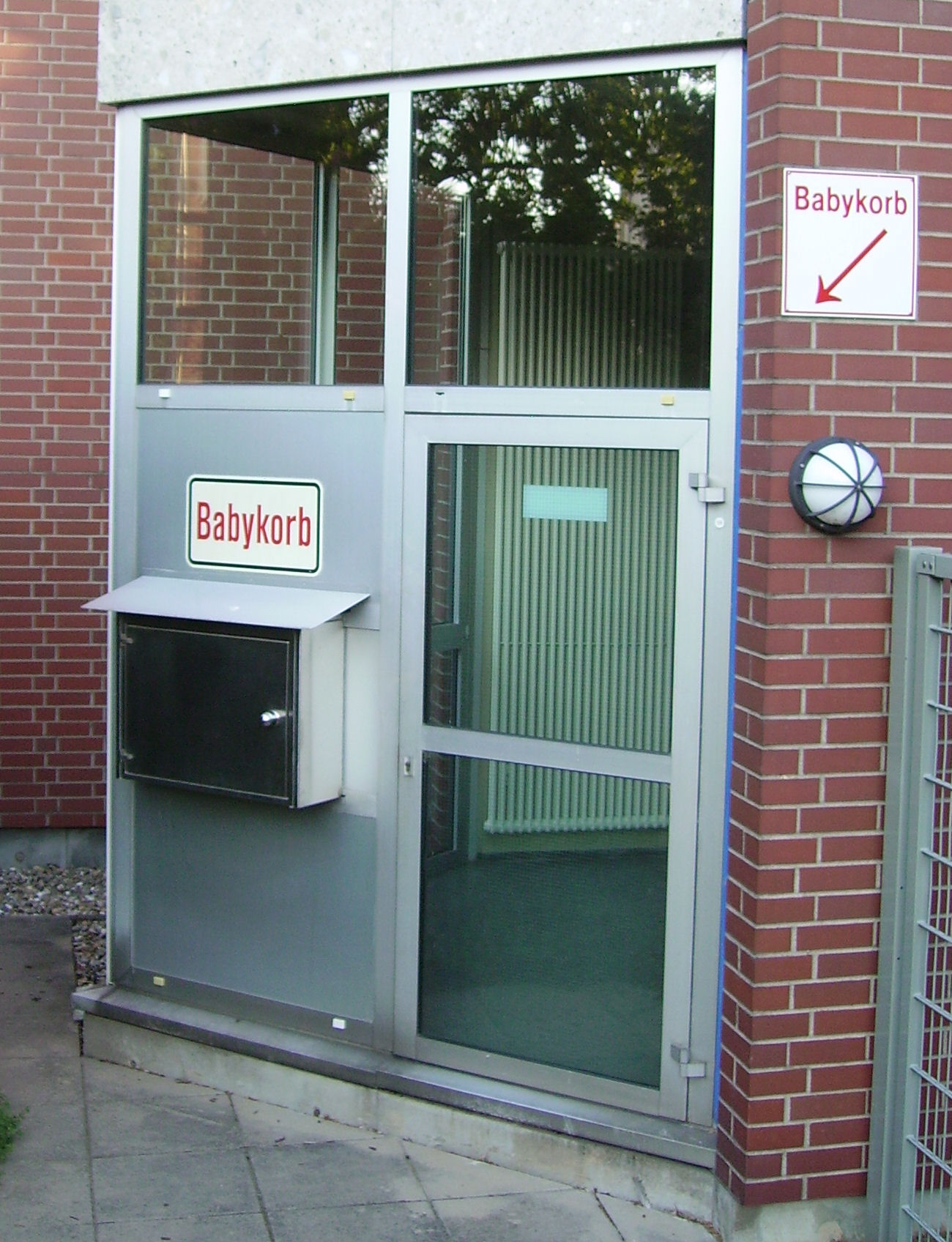
Baby hatch in Ludwigshafen, Germany

Baby hatches were reintroduced in Germany in 2000. As of 2020, there were around 70-100 baby hatches across the country.

There is no clear legal basis for operating baby hatches (known as Babyklappe) in Germany.

Normally, a mother or father who abandons their child is considered to be committing a criminal act. However, under German law parents are allowed to leave their child in charge of a third party for up to eight weeks, for example if the parents need to go into hospital. After eight weeks, however, the youth welfare office must be called in.

German law considers babies in baby hatches to have been left in charge of a third party. However, this loophole is extremely controversial and several attempts have been made to clear up the legal basis. As of yet, the legal situation remains unclear.

=== Hungary ===
In 2005, Hungary passed a law decriminalizing abandoning a baby in an incubator. The act is considered a declaration of abandonment and consent to adoption if the family does not return within six weeks to claim the child. Dumping a child elsewhere remains a crime.

Hungary had 32 baby hatches as of 2015, all run by hospitals. The first opened in 1996 in the Schöpf-Merei Hospital in Budapest and rescued 23 newborns until February 2007.

=== India ===
In Tamil Nadu state, a baby hatch was set up in 1994 by the then Chief Minister, J. Jayalalithaa, to prevent female infanticide. This kind of baby is called thottil kuzhanthai (cradle baby), raised by the state and entitled to free education. In 2002, an "e-cradle" scheme was also introduced in southern India after an abandoned newborn baby was torn apart by dogs in the street near Trivandrum Medical College.

=== Italy ===
There are about 50 hatches in Italy, set up by "La culla per la Vita" (The cradle for Life). In December 2006 a modern hatch was installed at the Policlinico Casilino in Rome, and in February 2007 it received its first abandoned child. There are also plans to install one at the Santo Spirito hospital at the Vatican City, the home of one of the original foundling wheels.

=== Japan ===
In Japan, abandoning a baby is normally punished with up to five years in prison. In 2006 Hasuda Taiji and other officials of Jikei Hospital applied to Kumamoto Prefecture government, Kumamoto city and other offices before opening a baby hatch. They were told that it would not count as abandonment, as the baby is under the hospital's protection. However, the Japanese Ministry of Health, Labour and Welfare would not comment on the issue, apart from saying that there was no precedent. In Japan, February 2007, the state indicated its position is that baby hatches "are not outright illegal." On the same year of April 5, Kumamoto City determined that "there are no reasonable grounds for not allowing modifications in the medical law," and approved changes that allowed establishment of the "Storks' Cradle".

In 2006 the Jikei Hospital in Kumamoto Prefecture announced it was setting up a "storks' cradle" to try to reduce the number of abandoned babies and abortions. The baby hatch was then installed in May 2007. As of March 2017, 125 babies had been left at the baby hatch. For a broader discussion of the social and legal context surrounding infant abandonment, see also Neonatal abandonment in Japan.

=== Latvia ===
The first glābējsilīte ('saviour manger') was set up in 2009 in Riga within the Children's Clinical University Hospital's territory. Since then, seven more hatches have been set up in Latvia's biggest towns. As of August 2019, 47 children have been left in a baby hatch, of whom five have later been reclaimed by their birth parents.

In Latvia, unless the baby has been reported as missing, the law treats the babies as foundlings.

All baby hatches are located within hospital premises. After a baby is left in a baby hatch, the police and custody court are informed about the case and the baby is given a health evaluation and is inspected for signs of abuse. The police during a two day long process find out if the child has been reported as missing, after that the baby is given the status of a foundling and can be put up for adoption.

If the birth parents want to recover a child, they have the option to do so until the child has been officially adopted. The birth parents must prove their parentage by taking a DNA test, which they must pay for themselves. After that, a custody court reviews the parent's reasons for abandonment and decide whether to allow the parents guardianship of the child.

=== Malaysia ===
The first baby hatch in Malaysia was launched by a non-profit NGO, OrphanCare Foundation, in 2010. By end of 2016 OrphanCare had saved over 200 babies and has two more baby hatches in the states of Kedah and Johor. In 2015 OrphanCare signed a memorandum of cooperation with KPJ Healthcare to manage the adoption of babies placed in baby hatches in eight KPJ hospitals in major cities in Peninsular Malaysia. KPJ also has a baby hatch each in Sabah and Sarawak.

Almost 100 babies have been saved due to baby hatches nationwide. The seventh baby hatch was opened at the An-Nur Specialist Hospital in Bangi, Selangor in 2022.

=== Netherlands ===
In 2003 plans to open a babyluik in Amsterdam did not go ahead after heavy protest. State Secretary for Health Clémence Ross suggested that baby hatches were illegal. In years since, the Beschermde Wieg Foundation has opened abandoned children rooms in the cities of Groningen, Middelburg, Oudenbosch, Papendrecht, Rotterdam and Zwolle. Women in need can leave their babies anonymously. As of 2017, a room in Amsterdam is planned.

=== Pakistan ===
The Edhi Foundation has around 300 centres which offer a jhoola service which is said to have saved over 16,000 lives; the jhoola is a white metal hanging cradle with a mattress, where the baby can be left anonymously outside the centre. A bell can be rung, and staff also check the cradle once an hour.

=== Philippines ===
The Hospicio de San Jose in Manila, founded in 1810 and run by the Daughters of Charity of Saint Vincent de Paul, has a "turning cradle" marked "Abandoned Babies Received Here".

=== Poland ===
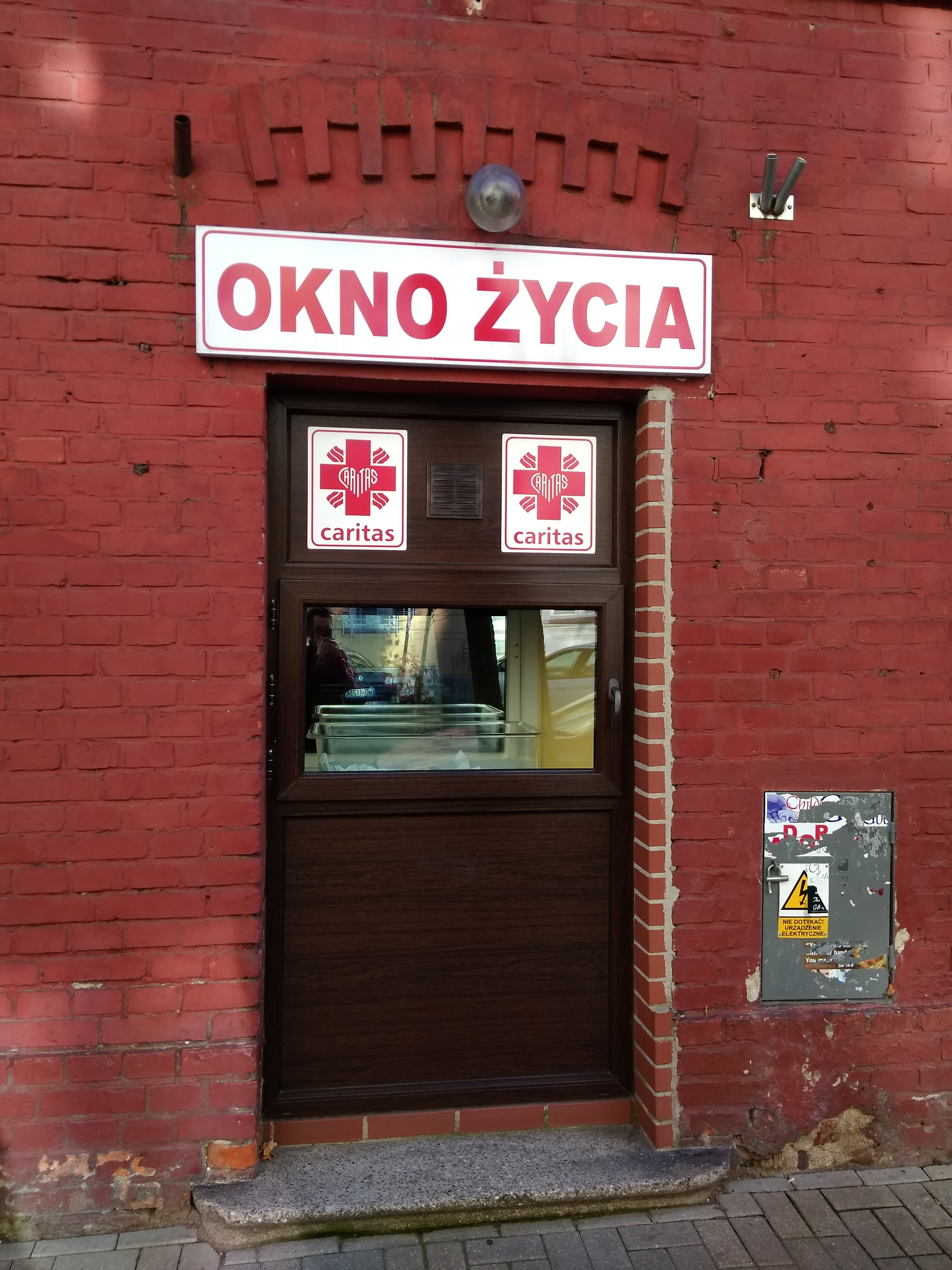
Baby hatch in Warsaw, Poland, 2018

The first modern baby hatch in Poland was opened on March 19, 2006. Since then, others have been provided in various cities across the country.

=== Russia ===
Since 2011, ten baby hatches have come into use in Russia. In less than one year of activity, the boxes helped to save three children. The charity fund The Cradle of Hope (Колыбель надежды) established in Perm is the main project organizer. Along with installing and setting up baby hatches, the organization works to prevent infanticide, and helps families cope with crisis situations. The baby hatches are installed in hospitals and run by the Wardship and Guardianship authority.

The law treats babies found in baby boxes as foundlings, who are raised by the state while going through the legal process of adoption. Senator Elena Mizulina proposed a law to ban baby boxes. In September 2016 the ban was approved by the Russian government, stating that special places for anonymous abandonment of newborns violate the Convention on the Rights of the Child.

=== South Africa ===
The non-profit organisation Door Of Hope Children's Mission set up a "hole in the wall" in July 1999 at the Mission Church in Johannesburg. By March 2013, around 148 babies came through the hole in the wall but over 1,300 babies have come through their doors.

=== South Korea ===
Pastor Lee Jong-rak operates a "baby box" in his church in southwest Seoul. Before the Special Adoption Law was passed in August 2012, Lee said that the baby box received an average of about two newborns per month, but that number has risen to about 19 as of 2013. Awareness of baby hatches in South Korea remains high.

=== Switzerland ===
There are eight baby hatches in Switzerland, almost all privately operated, at hospitals in Davos, Schwyz, Bellinzona, Olten, Bern, Zollikerberg ZH, Basel and Sion. From 2001 to 2021, 25 children were left there.

=== United Kingdom ===
In the United Kingdom there are no baby hatches, as, under Section 27 of the Offences against the Person Act 1861, abandoning a child below the age of two years is a criminal offence punishable by up to five years in prison. In practice, such prosecutions are extremely rare and would only occur if the circumstances of child abandonment showed actual malice, i.e. appeared deliberately intended to result in the death of the child. A mother who wishes to have her newborn baby adopted can do so. Counseling is designed to ensure that giving up the baby is her genuine, irrevocable wish.

=== United States ===
Baby hatches in the United States are generally called "newborn safety devices" or "newborn safety incubators." The first known installation of baby hatches in the United States was in Arizona in approximately 2001. Known as "drawers," the devices were installed primarily in Maricopa County, where six drawers exist at local hospitals as of May 2023. Beginning in 2016, the Indiana-based nonprofit corporation Safe Haven Baby Boxes began installing its own branded "Safe Haven Baby Boxes" in locations throughout Indiana, the first in 2016. As of June 2026, there were 456 baby hatches installed in 29 states, primarily Indiana and Florida, each of which has more than 100 hatches in operation.

== Cultural references ==
- In the novel Anthony Adverse by Hervey Allen, the main character is left in the foundling wheel of a convent in northern Italy.
- This type of abandonment is the main theme of a historical novella set in nineteenth-century Sicily, The Lady of the Wheel, by Angelo F. Coniglio.
- In the M*A*S*H episode "Yessir, That's Our Baby", the doctors eventually leave an abandoned, mixed race infant in the foundling wheel of a Catholic monastery after unsuccessfully attempting to get her taken care of by American agencies, due to the cruelty such children often face in Korea.
- "The Gap of Time", by Jeanette Winterson is a modern interpretation of The Winter's Tale in which her equivalent of Shakespeare's Perdita, instead of being abandoned on an island, is placed in a baby hatch in the fictional American city of New Bohemia.
- In Broker, the main characters operate an illegal business where they steal babies left at baby hatches and sell them on the black market.

== See also ==
- Harm reduction
- Maternity package, a cardboard box full of all the items needed for a baby's first year, also known as a baby box
