= Father absence =

Lack of a male parent in raising a child

Father absence occurs when parents separate and the father no longer lives with his children and provides no parental investment. Parental separation has been proven to affect a child's development and behavior. Early parental divorce (during primary school) has been associated with greater internalizing and externalizing behaviors in the child, while divorce later in childhood or adolescence may dampen academic performance.

Whilst father's absence mainly results from parental divorce and separation, including parental alienation, other factors such as family poverty and developmental difficulties have been associated with father absence, the effects of which have been explained by various theoretical approaches.

== Difficulties associated with father absence ==
=== General problems ===
Despite limited agreement among researchers regarding the exact significance of fathering, fathers are traditionally deemed a provider of protection and support for the child's development. Through a number of pathways, father absence may influence child behavior, especially in early and middle childhood. Father absence often results in a decline in household income, and ineffective parenting arising from continued conflicts between parents and psychological distress in the aftermath of the separation.

=== Effect on children of an absent parent following divorce ===
Research has shown that children who have experienced parental separation in early life often face developmental and behavioural difficulties through their childhood. For example, the separation of parents/guardians impacts children's relationship with their parents, their education, their health, and their well being. Many of the studies that have shown the negative effects of a father's absence on children have not taken into account other factors that potentially contribute such as the child's characteristics and relationship with the parents before the separation, the child's gender, and the family environment before the separation.

=== Behavioural and mental health difficulties ===
In regard to the effects of father absence, a recent British study assessed child problem behaviour in over 15,000 families using the clinical cut-offs of the Strengths and Difficulties Questionnaire (SDQ), controlling for household factors such as resources, parental mental health and inter-parental relationship. The study found that father absence at a given age, similar to poverty and parental psychological distress, predicted a high probability of the child scoring above the cut-off score for total difficulties two years later. Likewise, the father's absence predicted several specific difficulties including borderline personality disorder, severe hyperactivity, and abnormal emotional problems. Reciprocally, a child's severe externalizing and social during their preschool years were also associated with a greater probability of the father being absent two years later. The authors concluded that the father's absence seemed to be more of a cause than a consequence of the child's problem behavior.

Through direct interaction, fathers' involvement in children's development has a positive influence on their social, behavioral, and psychological outcomes. In general, the engagement of a fatherly figure reduces the frequency of behavioral problems and delinquency in sons and psychological problems in daughters, all the while facilitating children's cognitive development.

== Theoretical approaches ==
=== Evolutionary approach ===
Evolutionary life-history theory postulates that women may invest more in their offspring than men due to a slower rate of reproduction in females. Some theorists add that the assured maternal relatedness to one's offspring may also make women invest more than men. This is because some men may have variable paternity confidence that the child is his offspring.

=== Psychodynamic approach ===
The psychodynamic approach posits that behavior is motivated by basic needs and drives and is sometimes unconsciously shaped by childhood experience. The psychodynamic approach suggests that for a child to develop a "normal" gender identity, they must be raised in a conventional family with a father and a mother. Some psychoanalysts believed that being parented by a single mother could confuse the child's identity or lead them to become homosexual. Some psychoanalysts believe father absence may hinder a son's acquisition of the traditional masculine role, as he is not able to model his own behavior and attitude on his father. Along similar lines, sons with absent fathers could have confused gender identities: if a son is separated from his father by age four, he is less assertive, less involved in sports, less masculine than other boys, and more dependent on his peers. But findings of empirical studies on psychosexual gender identification have been deemed contradictory and inconclusive. Several studies have highlighted bad effects of the two-parent heterosexual household on children. Others have found that being reared in lesbian and single-parent households without fathers did not affect children's psychosexual development despite higher aggressiveness and submissiveness and lower assertiveness.

=== Biological approach ===
Genes and hormones may account for fathers' tendency to be absent. Certain DNA patterns have been shown to affect a person's degree of fidelity and investment in their offspring. In particular, a study of prairie voles found that the gene AVPR1A affects the activity of vasopressin receptors in the brain and thus predicts less cheating on their partners. Like oxytocin, vasopressin can facilitate trust, empathy and social bonding. Injection of vasopressin in polygamous montane voles significantly increased their likelihood of monogamy. This may, in turn, decrease their likelihood of being an absent father.

A meta-analysis based on 56 twin and adoption studies involving more than 200,000 families found that genetic makeup significantly affects parenting behavior. A father's genes predict up to 40% of his emotions toward his children. Genetically caused aversion to his children may result in a father's absence. But genes are not the sole predictors of whether a father will like his children.

== Sex differences ==
There is mixed empirical evidence on the relative impact of a father's absence on his offspring's development. A 2008 study in rural Ethiopia, where a father's absence could mean a significant decrease in household income, revealed a considerable difference between the well-being of male and female offspring. In particular, it found that a male infant's risk of dying per month doubled if his biological father was absent, a 30% greater risk than that for girls. For female infants, father absence (as opposed to presence) was associated with a lower risk of dying and better nutrition. Father absence was a statistical predictor of infant death only for male infants. This difference was observed despite a strong cultural preference for sons in the area. On the other hand, in developed countries such as the United Kingdom, where father absence may affect family income as much, the effects of father absence are not noticeably different on sons versus daughters. This suggests that other factors, such as household income and cultural norms, are significant in children's well-being and development.

=== Psychological impact on men ===
When a young man matures without his biological male role model, this can result in violent reactions to stress and emotions, resistance to and hatred of authority, aggression, earlier sexual encounters, transference of the mother's negative talk about the father, and pressure to become a breadwinner.

=== Psychological impact on women ===
Commonly agreed across authors within the literature on fatherhood is the idea that a "girl's relationship with her father serves as the model for all her relationships with men in her life, romantic and otherwise". Many studies conducted produce the same result: that the absence of a father in a daughter's life can lead to increased promiscuity and sexualized activity. Ellis et al. conducted one such study, "Does Father Absence Place Daughters at Special Risk for Early Sexual Activity and Teenage Pregnancy?" Ellis focuses more on the timing of the father's absence in his daughter's life, but promiscuity still proves contingent on the father's absence. Researchers have identified five factors that explain how fatherlessness affects women's psychological development.

==== Five-factors approach ====
- "Un-Factor": the development of the ideas of being "unworthy", "unlovable", and similar concepts in young women. When young women begin to believe these ideas, a self-fulfilling prophecy arises whereby they accept and attract love only from men who affirm their feelings of being unlovable, unworthy, or other "un-factor" ideas.
- "Triple Fears Factor", also known as abandoned child syndrome: three commonly identified fears—fear of rejection, fear of abandonment, and fear of commitment—express themselves. Each can be initially identifiable in the early stages of life without a father. The fatherless woman can adopt these fears due to the difficulty, trauma, or other pain created by her father's absence. Furthermore, an absent father can leave a woman feeling abandoned, "not good enough", bereaved, and uncertain about what it means to be committed and received versus disloyal or rejected. Being rejected can create contradictory emotions due to the familiarity and predictability of the situation versus the feelings of betrayal and the fear of being abandoned. Generally, "what these people will do is to play it safe to protect themselves; they will not put themselves in situations that are going to be intimate. They will be highly social, sexual, intellectual, but not intimate."
- "Sexual Healing Factor": most commonly identified across women of multiple age ranges and cultures for sexual expression, this tends to serve as the primary indication of fatherlessness in a woman. The Sexual Healing Factor in girls and women is attributed primarily to control. This sexual behavior exists on a spectrum, ranging from hypersexuality to complete avoidance of intimacy and asexuality. In both extremes, the girl maintains a sense of control, deciding exactly what sex will look like for her.
- "Over Factor": overeating or overachieving to compensate for the absent father. The intensity of these behaviors can reach levels comparable to obsession and/or addiction.
- "RAD Factor": most commonly expressed as rage, anger, and depression (RAD). These emotions can express themselves as a drive for previous factors (such as fueling overachievement or hypersexuality) and create increased impulsivity or criminal behavior, among other factors.

== Statistics ==
=== United States ===
According to the U.S. Census Bureau, as of 2018, of 11 million single-parent households, 80% were fatherless, and so were 81.5% of children. Of the 81.5% raised by single mothers, 34% were poor, 26.8% were jobless the entire year, and 30.3% had food insecurity; 2/3 of these families were white, 1/3 were black, and 1/3 were Hispanic-defined. It did not take into account the 53% of American-Indian and Alaskan-Native as well as the 17% Asian-American and Pacific-Islander children recorded within these single-parent homes.

In 2005, the United States Department of Health and Human Services reported that the average American teenage experience includes living in the absence of their father. This leads to multiple bad effects on youth: 85% are reported to have behavioral issues; 71% of high-school dropouts and teen mothers come from fatherless homes, which is nine times the national average; 85% of all children with behavioral disorders come from fatherless homes, which is 20 times the national average; 85% of youth in prison come from fatherless homes, which is 20 times the national average and 63% of youth suicides are of children who come from fatherless homes, which is five times the national average.

== Specific negative impacts ==
Early pubertal timing, or precocious puberty, is associated with bad effects in both genders. Early maturing girls have been found to be at risk for teenage pregnancy, drinking and weight problems, and giving birth to low birth weight infants. Early maturing boys are at risk for sexual promiscuity and delinquency and testicular and prostate cancer. Individual difference in pubertal timing may be influenced by weight, physical activity, and genetics.

=== Menarche ===
Menarche, a central event of female puberty, is associated with the father's absence. According to the evolutionary explanation, an unstable home environment (e.g. father absence) discourages a long-term mating life history, leading girls to adopt a short-term reproductive strategy, such as early menarche. This is because they perceive their resources as scarce and possibly their lifespan as shorter. Early menarche can increase the chance of fertility, while other short-term reproductive strategies can diversify the genes inherited in offspring. These could lift up a higher success rate of rearing children to adolescence. Moreover, the stress of father absence prompts girls to develop a variety of internalizing disorders, such as bulimia and depression, which may lower their metabolism, leading to weight gain, which precipitates early menarche. A study shows that there are fewer monitored meals in father-absent households.

Having meals in the family is arguably more beneficial to children than eating alone (i.e. solitary eating), as the former lowers the chance of obesity. It has been disputed whether the environmental stress of a father's absence stimulates weight gain and thus accelerates early puberty. Stress arising from an absent mother has been shown to have little influence on a child's body weight. Since mother absence does not predict weight gain in children, it seems that the increase in the child's body weight observed is due to the isolated genetic influence of an absent father rather than global environmental stress caused by absence of either parent. This is possible because in ancestral times the survival rate of children with absent mothers was extremely low. A specialized mechanism to deal with a mother's absence never developed.

In addition, recent findings seem to regard genes, rather than the environment, as the mechanism underlying the correlation between high body mass index and earlier menarche. The androgen receptor gene may predispose a father to impulsive and externalizing behavior (e.g. family abandonment) and his offspring to early puberty. The necessity of androgen receptors for female fertility and ovary development has been proven by rodent studies.

=== Sexual behavior ===
Father absence in a household can result in children (of both sexes) having earlier average ages of first sexual intercourse than those raised in father-present households. Teenage pregnancy rates are also higher. Some evolutionary theories propose that early childhood is vital for encoding information that shapes future reproductive strategies in regulating physical and motivational pathways of sexual behavior. Conflicting and stressful parental relationships can lead children to believe that resources are limited, people are untrustworthy, and relationships are opportunistic. As they replicate their parents' mating-oriented reproductive behavior, they tend to have multiple sexual partners and broken relationships. Children implicitly and explicitly model their sexual attitudes and behaviors on their parents, and see engagement in non-marital sex as normative. Father absence can be a byproduct of social and economic strain in the household, as violence, lack of educational opportunity, and cumulative life exposure to poverty can increase the likelihood of early sexual endeavors and pregnancy. The timing of first intercourse can be heritable; shorter alleles of the X-linked androgen receptor (AR) gene have been associated with aggression, impulsivity, high numbers of sexual partners, divorce in men, and earlier ages of physical maturation in girls.

== Mechanisms to balance father absence ==
=== Matrilineal support ===
A 2008 study in Ethiopia found that despite being poorer overall, widowed and divorced women were on average 2.4 kg heavier than women whose children's fathers are present. Widowed and divorced mothers and their daughters had have substantially better nutritional status, which could be explained by greater access to the mother's relatives (matrilateral kin). Furthermore, proximity to a mother's relatives can dramatically improve female children's height for age, an indicator of good nutrition. Women who return to their village of birth after marital dissolution are seen to benefit from extra matrilateral kin support.

=== Presence of a stepfather ===
In light of certain research, father absence can be disadvantageous; some evidence suggests stepfather presence does not reduce these disadvantages but in fact worsens them. For example, stepchildren have a markedly increased risk of physical abuse and homicide (the Cinderella effect). Although researchers have found a negative relationship between stepmothers and food expenditure, this effect is not observed with stepfathers and their stepchildren. Ellis and Garber (2000) and Ellis (2004) suggest that stepfather presence is a better predictor of age of menarche than father absence, as it indicates lower quality paternal investment. According to their findings, girls raised in families with stepfathers exhibit a significantly earlier menarche than girls raised without stepfathers.

Relative to other groups, children with a constantly absent biological father but a present stepfather reported more frequent sexual intercourse and earlier onset of sexual behavior. The mean age of children with their biological father absent or partially absent is about 15. More children with constantly absent biological fathers reported having sexual intercourse than those with partially absent ones. Those with a stepfather present and those with a biological father always absent have the earliest experiences of sexual intercourse, at on average age 15.11, whereas for children without a stepfather or their biological father partially absent the average is 15.38. The effect of having a partially absent biological father with no stepfather and the effect of both stepfather or biological father absence is the same. This study found that the presence of a stepfather does not compensate for the disadvantages of an absent biological father. Sometimes it has an even worse effect on children.

=== No agreement upon effective client treatment ===
Choice of effective treatment can vary greatly and thus be affected by many factors, including age, ability to understand and deal with emotionally heavy material, family member involvement, and the family and child's priorities and needs. In treating young girls, transference to a male therapist may help fill emotional voids created by father absence. But a connection with a consistent and empathetic adult can provide some paternal function, regardless of gender.

== See also ==
- Deadbeat parent
- Child neglect
- Father complex
