= Abandonment (emotional) =

Subjective emotional state

Emotional abandonment is an emotional state in which people feel undesired, left behind, insecure, or discarded. People experiencing emotional abandonment may feel at a loss. They may feel like they have been cut off from a crucial source of sustenance or feel withdrawn, either suddenly or through a process of erosion. Emotional abandonment can manifest through loss or separation from a loved one.

Feeling rejected, which is a significant component of emotional abandonment, has a biological impact in that it activates the physical pain centers of the brain and can leave an emotional imprint in the brain's warning system. Emotional abandonment has been a staple of poetry and literature since ancient times.

== Identification ==
Feelings of emotional abandonment can stem from numerous situations. According to Makino et al.:

Whether one considers a romantic rejection, the dissolution of a friendship, ostracism by a group, estrangement from family members, or merely being ignored or excluded in casual encounters, rejections have myriad emotional, psychological, and interpersonal consequences. People not only react strongly when they perceive that others have rejected them, but a great deal of human behavior is influenced by the desire to avoid rejection."

The perception of society on rejection or of being rejected can have a lasting effect on how an individual acts. A person's perception may impair their ability to establish and maintain close and meaningful relationships with others.

Individuals who experience feelings of emotional abandonment are likely to also experience maladaptive thoughts ("irrational beliefs") and behaviors such as depressive symptoms and relationship avoidance or dependence. This may cause abundant difficulty in daily life with interpersonal relationships and social settings. While such maladaptive thoughts and behaviors are sometimes present in the context of certain psychological disorders (e.g., borderline personality disorder, antisocial personality disorder, depression, anxiety disorders), not all individuals who experience feelings of emotional abandonment will meet criteria for such a psychological disorder. These individuals may function within normal limits in spite of the presence of these emotional difficulties. Such feelings should only be considered by a mental health professional in conjunction with all available information and diagnostic criteria prior to drawing conclusions about the state of someone's mental health.

== Associated conditions ==
=== Separation anxiety ===
Separation anxiety, a substrate of emotional abandonment, is recognized as a primary source of human distress and dysfunction. When one experiences a threat or disconnect within a primary attachment, it triggers a fear response referred to as separation stress or separation anxiety. Separation stress has been the subject of extensive research in psychological and neurobiological fields, and has been shown to be a universal response to separation in the animal world. When conducting experiments on rat pups, researchers separate the pups from their mothers for a period of time. They then measure their distress vocalizations and stress hormones to determine varying conditions of the separation response. As the rats mature, their subsequent reactive behaviors and stress hormones are reexamined and are shown to bear a striking resemblance to the depression, anxiety, avoidance behaviors, and self defeated posturing displayed by human beings known to have suffered earlier separation traumas.

Owing to the neocortical component of human functioning, when human beings lose a primary relationship, they are slow to grasp its potential repercussions (i.e. they may feel uncertain about the future or fear being unable to climb out of an abyss). There are additional factors that add to these fears such as "Unusual distress about being separated from a person or a pet, excessive worry that another person will be harmed if they leave them alone, heightened fear of being alone, physical symptoms when they know they will be separated from another person soon, excessive worry surrounding being alone, and needing to know where a spouse or loved one is at all times." All the aforementioned factors add an additional layer of separation stress. When the loss is due to the object's voluntary withdrawal, a common response is to feel unworthy of love. This indicates the tendency for people to blame the rejection on themselves. "Am I unworthy of love, destined to grow old and die all alone, bereft of human connection or caring?" Questioning one's desirability as a mate and fearing eternal isolation are among the additional anxieties incurred in abandonment scenarios. The concurrence of self devaluation and primal fear distinguish abandonment grief from most other types of bereavement.

=== Psychological trauma ===
The depression that might accompany abandonment can create a sustained type of stress that constitutes an emotional trauma which can be severe enough to leave an emotional imprint on an individual's psychobiological functioning. This can affect future choices and responses to rejection, loss, or even disconnection. One after-effect of abandonment is the experiencing triggers of primal fear of being separated. This type of fear, referred to as primal abandonment fear refers to the type of feeling individuals experience when left alone and having no one to take care of their needs which can be similar to abandonment, this is experienced by infants as a fear of being separated from their mother or primary caregiver which results in feeling similar to anxiety. This fearful sensation is stored in the amygdala – a structure set deep into the brain's emotional memory system responsible for conditioning the fight-or-flight response to fear. The emotional memory system is fairly intact at or before birth and lays down traces of the sensations and feelings of the infant's separation experiences. These primitive feelings are reawakened by later events, especially those reminiscent of unwanted or abrupt separations from a source of sustenance.

In adulthood, being left arouses primal fear along with other primitive sensations which contribute to feelings of terror and outright panic. Infantile needs and urgencies re-emerge and can precipitate a symbiotic regression in which individuals feel, at least momentarily, unable to survive without the lost object. People may also experience the intense stress of helplessness. When they make repeated attempts to compel their loved one to return and are unsuccessful, they feel helpless and inadequate to the task. This helplessness causes people to feel possessed of what Michael Balint calls "a limited capacity to perform the work of conquest – the work necessary to transform an indifferent object into a participating partner." According to Balint, feeling one's 'limited capacity' is traumatic in that it produces a fault line in the psyche which renders the person vulnerable to heightened emotional responses within primary relationships.

Another factor contributing to the traumatic conditions is the stress of losing one's background object. A background object is someone on whom individuals have come to rely in ways they did not realize until the object is no longer present. For instance, the relationship served as a mutual regulatory system. Multiple psychobiological systems helped to maintain individuals' equilibrium. As members of a couple, they became external regulators for one another. They were attuned on many levels: their pupils dilated in synchrony, they echoed one another's speech patterns, movements, and even cardiac and EEG rhythms. As a couple, they functioned like a mutual bio-feedback system, stimulating and modulating each other's bio rhythms, responding to one another's pheromones, and addicting to the steady trickle of endogenous opioids induced by the relationship. When the relationship ends, the many processes it helped to regulate go into disarray. As the emotional and bio-physiological effects mount, the stressful process is heightened by the knowledge that it was not the person, but their loved one who chose to withdraw from the bond. This knowledge may cause people to interpret their intense emotional responses to the disconnection as evidence of their putative weakness and 'limited capacity to perform the work of conquest'.

==== Post-traumatic stress disorder ====
Some people who experience the traumatic stress of abandonment go on to develop post-traumatic stress disorder (PTSD). PTSD symptoms include a sequela of heightened emotional reactions (ranging from mild to severe) and habituated defense mechanisms (many of which have become maladaptive) to perceived threats or disruptions to one's sense of self or to one's connections.

There are various predisposing psycho-biological and environmental factors that go into determining whether one's earlier emotional trauma might lead to the development of a true clinical picture of post-traumatic stress disorder. One factor has to do with variation in certain brain structures. According to Jerome Kagan, some people are born with a locus coeruleus that tends to produce higher concentrations of norepinephrine, a brain chemical involved in arousal of the body's fight-or-flight response. This would lower their threshold for becoming aroused and make them more likely to become anxious when they encounter stresses in life that are reminiscent of childhood separations and fears, hence making them more prone to developing PTSD.

=== Borderline personality disorder ===
The most distinguishing symptoms of borderline personality disorder (BPD) are marked sensitivity to rejection or criticism, and intense fear of possible abandonment. Overall, the features of BPD include unusually intense sensitivity in relationships with others, difficulty regulating emotions, issues with self-image and impulsivity. Fear of abandonment may lead to overlapping dating relationships as a new relationship is developed to protect against abandonment in the existing relationship.

=== Autophobia ===
Autophobia is the specific phobia of isolation; a morbid fear of being alone or isolated. Sufferers need not be physically alone, but just to believe that they are being ignored or unloved.

== Treatment ==
A form of therapy that is suited to this population is acceptance and commitment therapy (ACT). ACT focuses on an individual's avoidance of painful emotions and memories. ACT techniques are designed to cultivate thought processes that are focused on being present in the moment and accepting uncomfortable or painful thoughts and feelings. Reframing maladaptive perceptions of one's thoughts to adaptive perceptions of thoughts and committing to aligning one's behaviors with one's goals and values is fundamental to ACT treatment.

== See also ==
- Attachment theory
- Barrel children
- Child abandonment
- Child neglect
- Divine apathy
- Psychosocial distress
- Social exclusion
