= Sugamo child abandonment case =

1988 incident in Tokyo, Japan

The Sugamo child-abandonment case (巣鴨子供置き去り事件, Sugamo kodomo okizari jiken) was a situation uncovered in 1988 in Tokyo's Toshima Ward. It involved a woman who abandoned her four young children for months, resulting in the death of one. The names of the children were never released and were referred to simply as Children A, B, C, D, and E. The incident was covered extensively by both Japanese and international media, and was later the basis of the 2004 drama film Nobody Knows.

== Background ==
Child A, a boy, was born in 1973; Child B in 1981. Child C died soon after birth in 1984. Children D and E were born in 1985 and 1986 respectively. All of the children had different fathers. Although it is unclear, it appears that none of the children were registered and none of them had attended school. In Autumn 1987, having met a new boyfriend, the mother placed Child A in charge of the others, leaving him with ¥50,000 (around US$350 at the time) for their living expenses in their Tokyo apartment.

== Discovery ==
On April 14, 1988, the youngest, Child E, was assaulted by friends of Child A (known only as Friend A and Friend B), and died as a result. On July 17 of the same year, acting on a tip from the landlord, Sugamo officials entered the apartment and discovered the severely malnourished Child A (then 14), Child B (seven), and Child D (three). They also found the body of Child C, but not Child E. The information given by the children was vague. It was determined that the malnourishment was caused in part by the children's diet, which consisted largely of food bought at convenience stores.

As a result of news coverage of the incident, the mother turned herself in on July 23. Her testimony revealed that the children had been alone for about nine months and that the whereabouts of Child E were unknown. On July 25, Child A's testimony revealed that Child E had been killed by Friend B of Child A, and that her body had been buried in a wood in Chichibu by Child A and Friend A. Friend A and Friend B were sent to a reform school for their involvement in the death.

In August 1988, the mother was indicted for child abandonment. She received a three-year sentence, suspended for four years. Although Child A was probably not present at the time of his sister's death, he did assist Friend A in burying the body; he was indicted for abandoning a body, but in consideration of the circumstances was remanded to a care facility. After the mother's three-year sentence, she regained custody of the two daughters.

== Film adaptation ==
The 2004 film Nobody Knows, directed by Hirokazu Kore-eda, presents a fictionalized account of the incident with various details altered.

== See also ==
- Rie Fujii
- Osaka child abandonment case
- Coin-operated-locker babies
