= Nobody Knows (2004 film) =

Japanese drama film by Hirokazu Kore-eda

- Theatrical release poster
- Directed by: Hirokazu Kore-eda
- Written by: Hirokazu Kore-eda
- Produced by: Hirokazu Kore-eda
- Starring: Yuya Yagira; Ayu Kitaura; Hiei Kimura
- Cinematography: Yutaka Yamasaki
- Edited by: Hirokazu Kore-eda
- Music by: Gontiti; Takako Tate
- Production companies: Cinequanon, Bandai Visual
- Distributed by: Cinequanon, IFC Films (USA)
- Release dates: May 13, 2004 (Cannes); August 7, 2004 (Japan)
- Running time: 141 minutes
- Country: Japan
- Language: Japanese
- Box office: US$2,265,264

Nobody Knows (Japanese: 誰も知らない, Hepburn: Dare mo Shiranai) is a 2004 Japanese drama film based on the 1988 Sugamo child abandonment case. The film is written, produced, directed and edited by Hirokazu Kore-eda, and it stars Yuya Yagira, Ayu Kitaura, and Hiei Kimura.

Nobody Knows tells the story of four children: Akira, Kyōko, Shigeru, and Yuki, who are aged between twelve and five years old. They are half-siblings, with each of them having a different father. Because the three youngest children are in the apartment illegally without the landlord's knowledge or permission, they cannot go outside or be seen in the apartment, and they do not attend school. Their mother leaves them alone for weeks, and finally does not return. Forced over time to survive on their own, they can only rely on each other to face the multiple challenges in front of them.

Nobody Knows was first shown at the 2004 Cannes Film Festival on 12 May 2004. It was subsequently released in Japanese cinemas on 7 August 2004. The film received widespread critical acclaim, and it grossed over US$11 million worldwide. It won several awards, most notably Best Actor at the 2004 Cannes Film Festival as well as Best Film and Best Director awards at the 47th Blue Ribbon Awards. At the time Yuya Yagira became the youngest Best Actor winner in the history of the Cannes Film Festival. It was Japan's official submission for Best Foreign Language Film at the 77th Academy Awards, but was not accepted as a nominee.

== Plot ==
A young mother and her four children move into a small apartment in Tokyo. Only the eldest, Akira, is known to the landlord; he and his mother Keiko smuggle the youngest boy and girl, Shigeru and Yuki, into the apartment inside suitcases. The elder sister, Kyōko, comes separately by train. Each of the children has a different father. Their mother does not allow them to go to school or be seen by others, and only Akira is allowed to go outside.

After a few months, Keiko tells Akira that she has a new boyfriend, and that after she gets married, the children can lead normal lives, but Akira seems doubtful. Without warning, Keiko leaves home and is away for months, leaving only a small amount of money for the children. Akira is forced to take charge of paying the rent and other expenses and caring for his younger siblings. When they run out of money, Akira goes to see several men who may be Yuki's biological father and asks them for money.

At length, Keiko returns, bringing all the children gifts, but soon leaves again. Though she promises she will be back in time for Christmas, she breaks this promise, and the season changes to the New Year and then to spring without her returning, forcing Akira and Kyōko into the roles of surrogate parents. Akira soon finds evidence that she has already married and left them forever, though he does not tell his siblings. Again running out of money, they are unable to pay their rent any longer and subsist on inexpensive food from the convenience store. On Yuki's birthday, she asks to go outside to wait for their mother at the train station. The siblings enjoy a day out together, and though their mother does not return, Akira promises Yuki that one day he will take her on the Tokyo Monorail to see the airplanes take off at Haneda Airport.

Akira befriends two boys his own age at a game arcade who start frequenting the family's apartment, playing games and roughhousing, and he begins to neglect his siblings. The apartment is falling into disrepair with no one cleaning or keeping up with other chores. When Akira and the two boys go to the convenience store one day, they dare him to shoplift. Akira refuses, and the two boys leave him. Several months later, when the two have entered junior high school, Akira comes by their school and invites them over to play, but they refuse, and Akira overhears them saying that his house smells like garbage. In an apologetic gesture, Akira takes his siblings to a nearby park to play and buys them candy and toys at the convenience store. They start a garden on the veranda of the apartment, planting seeds from wildflowers inside instant noodle cups.

Eventually the electricity, gas, and water in the apartment are all turned off. The children start using the public park's toilet to wash themselves and the tap there for their water. On one of these visits, Shigeru starts a conversation with Saki, a high school student who is cutting class, which blossoms into a friendship between her and the siblings, and she begins to visit them and help Akira and Kyoko care for the family. However, when she tries to help Akira out of financial difficulties by offering him money obtained through enjo kōsai, Akira rejects it and runs away.

With summer approaching, the children have little money and are growing weary. Akira goes out one day to watch a junior high school's baseball match. The team's coach spots him and, short a player, asks him to sub in. Akira joins the game and enjoys playing baseball. While he is away, Yuki falls from a stool while trying to reach for something and dies. Akira goes to find Saki again, finally accepting her offer of financial support, and they buy as many boxes as they can find of Yuki's favorite chocolate candies, which they place with Yuki's dead body in a suitcase. With Saki's help, Akira takes the suitcase to a field near Haneda Airport's runway. They sit and watch planes come in, and then he and Saki dig a grave and bury the suitcase. They then return to the apartment, and the film ends with Akira, Kyōko, Shigeru, and Saki still together, walking home. Saki now has her hair in pigtails, almost like the longer pigtails Yuki used to wear.

== Cast ==
- Yuya Yagira as Akira Fukushima (福島明), the eldest son, age twelve. According to his mother, his father worked at Haneda Airport. After their mother disappears, he becomes the surrogate head of the family and takes care of his siblings.
- Ayu Kitaura as Kyōko Fukushima (福島京子), the oldest daughter and the second-eldest child, eleven years old. Keiko says her father was a music producer, and she dreams of owning her own piano. She takes charge of the laundry and other household chores.
- Hiei Kimura as Shigeru Fukushima (福島茂), the younger son. He is very playful and energetic; Keiko claims he was the reason why they have had to move out of their previous apartment.
- Momoko Shimizu as Yuki Fukushima (福島ゆき), the youngest child. She is five years old, and the identity of her biological father is unknown. She loves to draw and eat Apollo Chocolate candies.
- Hanae Kan as Saki Mizuguchi (水口紗希), a high school student who is bullied by her classmates and frequently skips school, who befriends Akira and his siblings and helps them.
- You as Keiko Fukushima (福島けい子), the mother of the children. She leaves to be with a man she hopes to marry and never returns.
- Kazumi Kushida as Tadashi Yoshinaga (吉永忠志), the landlord
- Yukiko Okamoto as Eriko Yoshinaga (吉永江理子), the landlord's wife
- Sei Hiraizumi as the convenience store manager who mistakes Akira for a shoplifter
- Ryō Kase as a convenience store employee who gives Akira leftover sushi from the store to take home
- Yūichi Kimura as Sugihara, the taxi driver and possible father of Yuki
- Kenichi Endō as the pachinko parlor employee and possible father of Yuki
- Susumu Terajima as the baseball coach
- Takako Tate as the convenience store cashier; Tate also performs the film's theme song
- Yūji Maeda
- Mari Hayashida

== Production ==
=== Development ===
According to the director Hirokazu Kore-eda, though Nobody Knows was inspired by the true story of the Sugamo child abandonment case, it is not a factual recounting, and only the settings and the ending of the story are based on the true story.

Hirokazu Kore-eda had drafted and revised several screenplays for over 15 years. He also spent a very long time getting to know his subjects, and wanted the young cast members to interact, grow, and express their personalities freely, with as little adult dictation as possible. He did not use the usual structuring and cueing methods, but instead uses a discreet camera to show how children really live when no one is looking. Also, when the director discovered the actress Momoko Shimizu who played Yuki liked Apollo Choco more than Strawberry Pocky as was in the script, he changed his script to suit that and made her smile brighter. He chose not to make it a "feel-good" movie even though similar Japanese dramas often are. He avoided sentiment, aiming for a more stoic picture. This is because he wanted the audience to "take away something" from the film.

=== Pre-production ===
The director Hirokazu Kore-eda held extensive auditions to cast the four children, and the actors were all nonprofessionals. Also, during the casting, a little girl came in with noisy sandals. The director liked it so much that he brought it over to Yuki's character when searching for her mother. He also did not give the children detailed explanations of their roles, because he wanted them to be natural.

=== Filming ===
The filming took over a year, lasting from autumn 2002 to summer 2003. The reel was filmed chronologically and 70% of the story was set in a cramped Tokyo apartment (with every room built specifically for the film). The apartment was specially rented for a year for the filming of this film, and the filming assistants lived in the apartment when it was not used for filming. Director Hirokazu Kore-eda said that during the long filming period, he tried to build a relationship of trust between himself and the children, and also amongst the children themselves. During the children's filming breaks, the children were asked to write in their own journal entries about what they were thinking, ranging from the film to their own everyday concerns.

=== Post-production ===
Nobody Knows held its first public screening at the Le Theatre in Ginza, Tokyo on June 30, 2004 after the film debuted at the 2004 Cannes Film Festival.

=== Music ===
The soundtrack for the movie was written by the Japanese guitar duo Gontiti.

The ending song, "Hōseki", was sung by Takako Tate, who also appears in the film.

== Release ==
=== Film festivals ===
Nobody Knows competed for the Palme d'Or at the 2004 Cannes Film Festival on 12 May 2004.

In 2025, the film was showcased in the section 'Decisive Moments in Asian Cinema' at the 30th Busan International Film Festival, as part of the special "Asian Cinema 100", being the signature work of the director Hirokazu Kore-eda.

=== Home media ===
A DVD of Nobody Knows was released in Japan on 11 March 2005. It was released in DVD (region 2) format, and it has both English and Japanese subtitles. Separately, the Making of Nobody Knows DVD, which contains 41 minutes' worth of film taken during the filming of Nobody Knows, was released on 23 December 2004.

== Reception ==
=== Critical reception ===
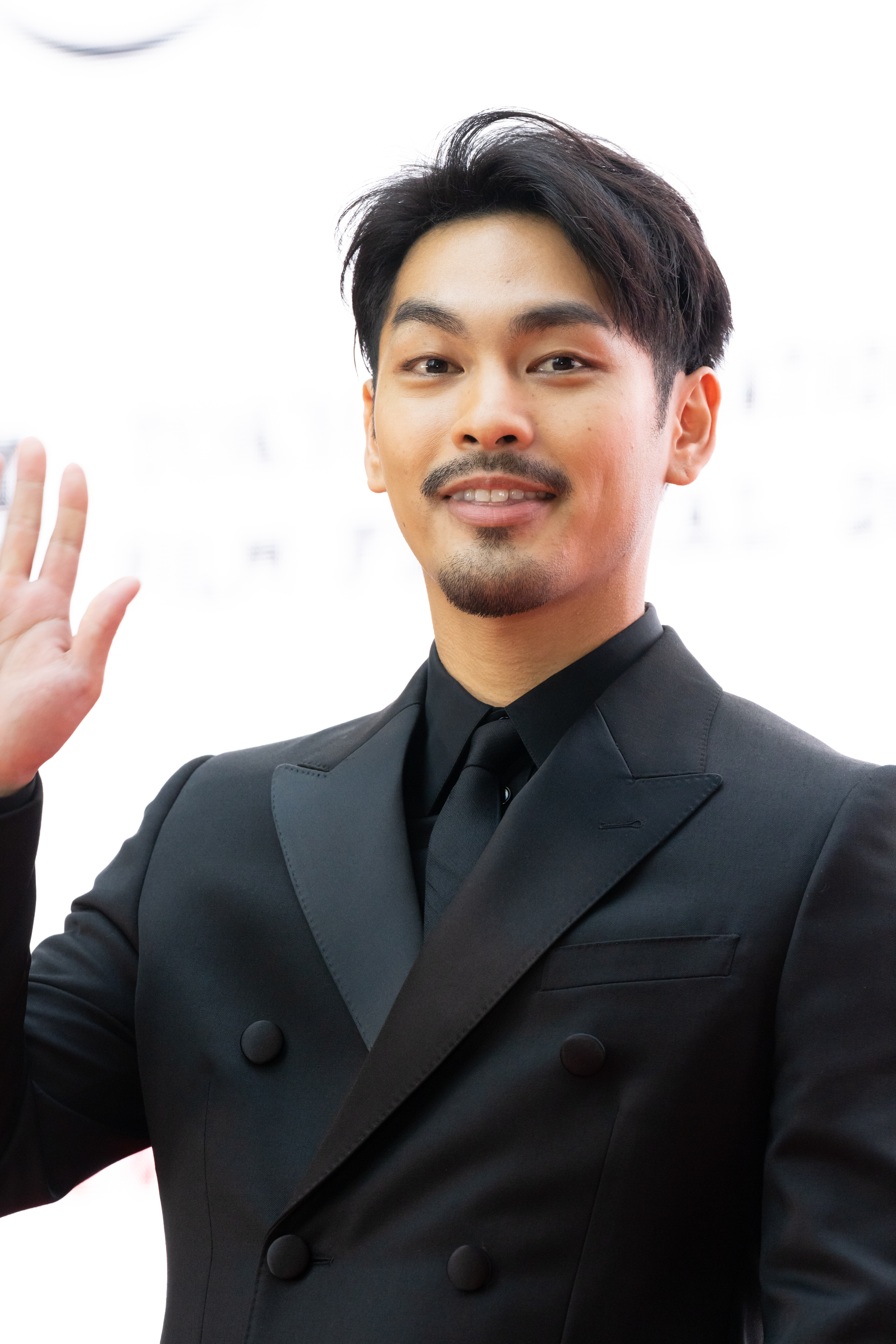
Yuya Yagira at the Tokyo International Film Festival in 2022.

Nobody Knows has received widespread acclaim from critics. On Rotten Tomatoes, the film has an approval rating of 93% based on 94 reviews, with an average ratings of 8/10. The site's critical consensus reads, "Tragic and haunting, a beautifully heart-wrenching portrait of child abandonment." On Metacritic, the film has a score of 88 out of 100, with all 31 critics giving positive reviews, indicating "universal acclaim".

The Japan Times gave the film a rating of four out of five. The reviewer Mark Schilling describes the film's young actors as "superb", and said that the film "faithfully reflects the fabric of the children's lives over the course of a year". The New York Times says that the film is "too naturalistic, and too disturbing, to be a movie for children, but it nonetheless engages the audience's wondering, childlike imagination as well as its worrying adult conscience". It further adds that "It is also strangely thrilling, not only because of the quiet assurance of Mr. Kore-eda's direction, but also because of his alert, humane sense of sympathy".

In a 2013 review of a later film by Kore-eda, Andrew Schenker of Slant Magazine referred to Nobody Knows as the director's best film.

In 2024, Looper ranked it number 46 on its list of the "50 Best PG-13 Movies of All Time."

=== Accolades ===
Yūya Yagira won the award for Best Actor at the 2004 Cannes Film Festival. He was the first Japanese actor to win this category at the Cannes. The film had also won the "Best One" award for Japanese film at the 78th Kinema Junpo Ten Best awards. At the same award ceremony, You won the best supporting actress and Yūya Yagira won the best new actor award.

At the 47th Blue Ribbon Awards, Nobody Knows won the best film award. Director Hirokazu Kore-eda also won the "Best Director" award.

The film received the Grand Prix for Best Film at Film Fest Gent in 2004.

== See also ==
- Cinema of Japan
- List of submissions to the 77th Academy Awards for Best Foreign Language Film
- List of Japanese submissions for the Academy Award for Best Foreign Language Film
