= Osaka child abandonment case =

2010 child abandonment case in Japan

- Location: Nishi, Osaka Prefecture, Japan
- Date: June 9, 2010 to July 31, 2010
- Attack type: Child abandonment, Murder, Starvation
- Deaths: 2
- Victims: Sakurako Hagi, 3, Kaede Hagi, 1
- Perpetrator: Sanae Shimomura
- Motive: To stop taking care of the children

The Osaka child abandonment case was a case of child abandonment involving two abandoned children in Osaka, Japan. On 9 June 2010, Sanae Shimomura, a 23-year-old Japanese single mother in Osaka, sealed the door of her apartment shut, abandoning 3-year-old daughter Sakurako Hagi and 1-year-old son Kaede Hagi inside. The children were locked inside for 50 days before being found dead.

== Background ==
Shimomura was raised in Yokkaichi, Mie Prefecture by her mother alongside her two siblings. Her mother was often absent, going out and leaving the children at home alone. Shimomura said that she often was left in dirty clothes and that the house was often covered with their dog's feces. When she was six years old, her mother left home after her husband, Katsuya, caught her cheating, taking Shimomura (the eldest child of the family) and her younger sibling (the second oldest) with her. When Shimomura was in first grade, her parents divorced, and her father took custody of Shimomura and her siblings.

In junior high, Shimomura was raped, and subsequently dropped out of school. She didn't tell her father about the incident.

Shimomura later married at the age of 19 and had two children. They later divorced with Shimomura raising the children alone without any form of financial support from her ex-husband. After working at a restaurant in Nagoya, Shimomura later moved to Osaka along with her children in early 2010 and began working at a hotel.

== Abandonment ==
Neighbors reported children crying in the apartment on March 3, April 8, and May 18, the last call prompting a police officer to visit the building, but he left without intervention after being unable to hear the children crying. Since Shimomura did not come to work for several days, a colleague went to her place and noticed a strange smell beyond the door. When the police entered the apartment, they found the two children dead. Social workers had attempted to stop by the apartment several times over the course of the children's confinement, but never found anyone home. The apartment was in a lively, populated area, but nobody knew that the children were confined.

Shimomura was arrested on 30 July 2010. Following her arrest, she underwent a psychological evaluation before being formally charged on 4 February 2011. She was reported to have wanted free time for herself and was quoted as saying that she had grown "tired of feeding and bathing" her two children. Prior to the children's abandonment, Shimomura left only a small amount of food in the apartment and taped the room shut with adhesive tape. However, she later denied intending to kill the children. She was sentenced to 30 years in prison for the murders. The judge who presided over the trial, Judge Masaki Nishida, described Shimomura's actions as "cruel" and pointed out that she was "turning a blind eye to reality and spending time with men is reprehensible." In her final statement, Shimomura said that she took responsibility for her actions. As of 2026, Shimomura remains imprisoned.

== See also ==
- Rie Fujii, concerning a very similar incident involving two children abandoned in an apartment in Calgary, Canada.
- Sugamo child abandonment case, a similar incident that took place in a neighborhood near Tokyo, Japan.
- Coin-operated-locker babies
- Baby hatches
- Child abandonment
