= Child abandonment =

Crime or process of giving up one's child

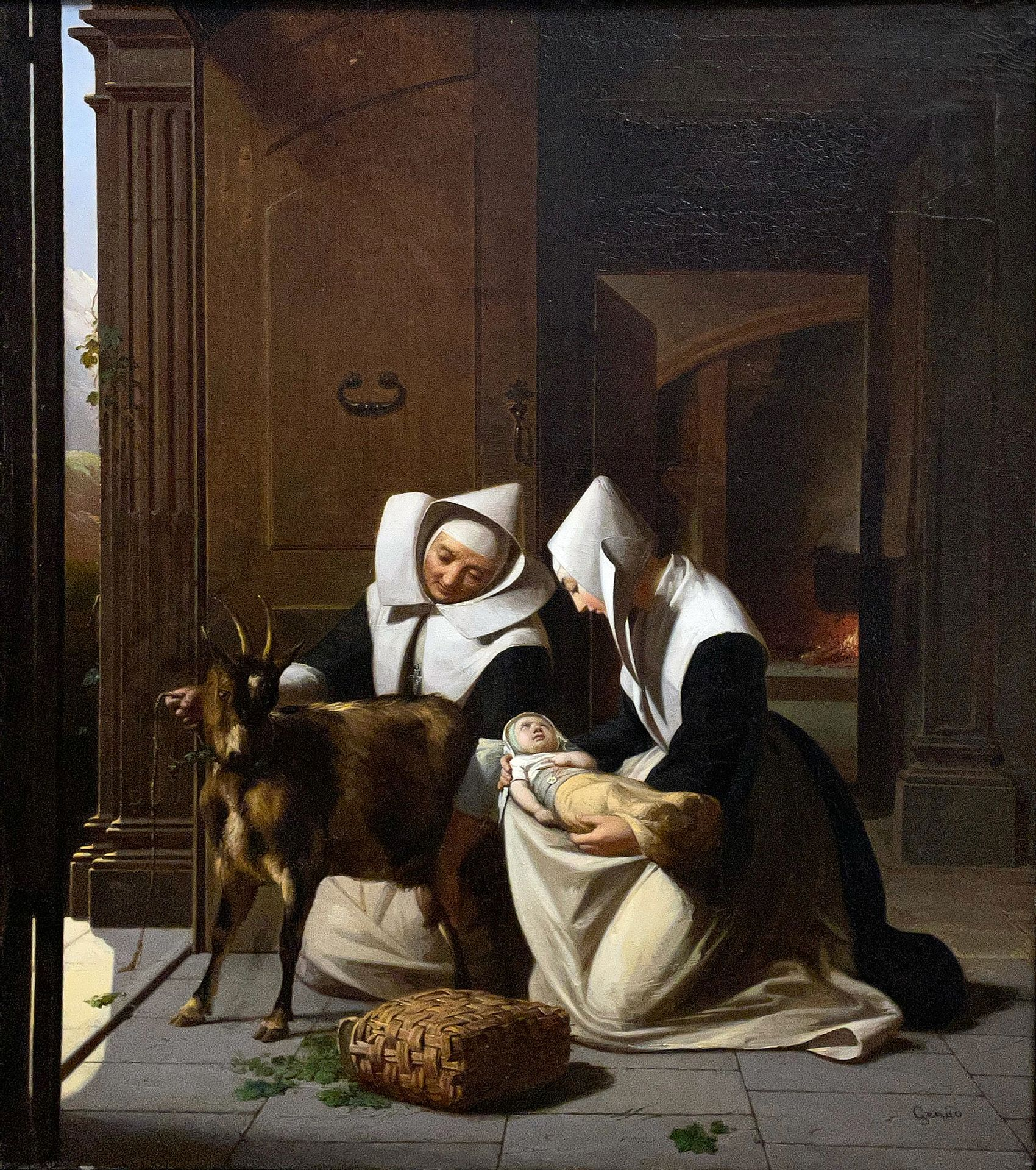
A foundling being taken in by nuns (L'Enfant recueilli by Michel Philibert Genod)

Child abandonment is the practice of relinquishing interests and claims over one's offspring in an illegal way, with the intent of never resuming or reasserting guardianship. The phrase is typically used to describe the physical abandonment of a child. Still, it can also include severe cases of neglect and emotional abandonment, such as when parents fail to provide financial and emotional support for children over an extended period (sometimes referred to as "throwaway" children). An abandoned child is referred to as a foundling (as opposed to a runaway or an orphan). Baby dumping refers to parents leaving a child younger than 12 months in a public or private place with the intent of terminating their care for the child. It is also known as rehoming when adoptive parents use illegal means, such as the internet, to find new homes for their children. In the case where child abandonment is anonymous within the first 12 months, it may be referred to as secret child abandonment.

In the United States and many other countries, child abandonment is usually treated as a subset of the broader category of child abuse. (However, all 50 states and D.C. have laws allowing a parent to permanently surrender a child at a designated safe haven "where they will not be prosecuted.") In the United States it is punishable as a class 4 felony, and a second or subsequent offense after a prior conviction is a class 3 felony (see classes of felonies) with different state judicial systems treating it with varying severities and classifications. Child abandonment may lead to the permanent loss of parental rights of the parents. Some states allow for reinstatement of the parental rights, with about half of the states in the US having had laws for this purpose. Perpetrators can also be charged with reckless abandonment if victims die as a result of their actions or neglect.

Official statistics on child abandonment do not exist in most countries. In Denmark, an estimate of child abandonment prevalence was 1.7 infants per 100,000 births, with another source suggesting higher prevalence in Central and Eastern European countries such as Slovakia with data suggesting 4.9 per 1,000 live births.

== Causes ==
- Poverty and homelessness are often causes of child abandonment. People living in countries with poor social welfare systems (i.e. China, Myanmar, Mexico and other countries) who are not financially capable of taking care of a child are more likely to abandon their children because of a lack of resources. In some cases the parents already have a child or children, but are unable to take care of another child at that time.
- In societies where young women and young men are looked down upon for being teenage or single mothers and single fathers, child abandonment is more common.
- Children born out of the confines of marriage may be abandoned in a family's attempt to prevent being shamed by their community.
- Physical disability, mental illness, and substance abuse problems that parents face.
- Children who are born with congenital disorders or other health complications may be abandoned if their parents feel unequipped to provide them with the level of care that their condition requires.
- In cultures where the sex of the child is of utmost importance, parents are more likely to abandon a baby of the undesired sex. Similarly, people may choose to pursue the often controversial option of sex-selective abortion.
- Political conditions, such as war and displacement of a family, also cause parents to abandon their children.
- Additionally, a parent being incarcerated or deported can result in the involuntary abandonment of a child, even if the parent(s) did not voluntarily relinquish their parental role.
- Disownment of a child is a form of abandonment that entails ending contact with and support for one's dependent. Disownment tends to occur later in a child's life, generally due to a conflict between the parent(s) and the child, but can also occur when children are still young. Reasons include: divorce of parents, discovering the true paternity of a child, and a child's actions bringing shame to a family; most commonly, breaking the law, teenage pregnancy, major religious or ideological differences, and identifying as LGBT.

== Effects on survivors ==
- Possibility of experiencing abuse and neglect in institutionalized care
- Low self-esteem stemming from feelings of guilt about being at fault for being abandoned
- Separation anxiety: feelings of anxiety about being separated from parents or caregivers
- Attachment issues: difficulty becoming emotionally attached to and trusting other people, especially caregivers
- Abandonment issues, characteristic of abandoned child syndrome, including social alienation, guilt, anxiety, clinginess, insomnia and nightmares, eating disorders, anger issues, depression, substance abuse, and traumatic reenactment through romantic relationships
- Symptoms of post-traumatic stress disorder (PTSD), referred to as posttraumatic stress disorder of abandonment.
- Depending upon the severity of their symptoms, children who have developed certain maladjusted tendencies in social interaction may be diagnosed with reactive attachment disorder or disinhibited social engagement disorder.
- For children who are abandoned in dangerous places, such as dumpsters, doorsteps, and other public areas, exposure to the elements and physical injury are distinct possibilities.

== Financial cost ==
In 2015, the United States' government spent over $9 billion to support 427,910 children who were in foster care.

== Child abandonment laws ==
Child abandonment is illegal in most of the world, and depending upon the facts of the case and laws of the state in which it occurs could be prosecuted as a misdemeanor or felony criminal offense.

== Prevention ==
- Providing access to sex education and to family planning resources, like contraception, and abortion can help prevent people who cannot take care of, or do not want to raise, children from becoming pregnant in the first place.
- Evidence has shown that, when bans on abortion are lifted, the number of abandoned, abused, and neglected children goes down in response. However, access is an issue. In the United States, 87% of all counties, and 97% of all rural counties, do not have any access to abortion services.
- Governmental assistance can be provided in the form of parental counseling, post-natal services, mental health services, and other community support services for parents who are at a higher risk of abandoning their children because of age, support, physical ability, mental illness, or poverty.

== History ==
Historically, many cultures practiced abandonment of infants, often called "infant exposure." Children were left on hillsides, in the wilderness, near churches, and in other public places. If taken up by others, the children might join another family either as slaves or as free family members. Roman societies, in particular, chose slaves to raise their children rather than family members, who were often indifferent towards their children. Although being found by others would allow children who were abandoned to often survive, exposure is sometimes compared to infanticide—as described by Tertullian in his Apology: "it is certainly the more cruel way to kill... by exposure to cold and hunger and dogs." Despite the comparison, other sources report that infanticide and exposure were viewed as morally different in ancient times.

In the Early Middle Ages, parents who did not want to raise their children gave them to monasteries with a small fee, an act known as oblation, and in times of social stress, monasteries often received large numbers of children. By the high Middle Ages, oblation was less common and more often arranged privately between the monastery and the parents of the child. Sometimes, medieval hospitals cared for abandoned children at the community's expense. Still, some refused to do so because being willing to accept abandoned children would increase abandonment rates. Medieval laws in Europe governing child abandonment, as the Visigothic Code, often prescribed that the person who had taken up the child was entitled to the child's service as a slave. Conscripting or enslaving children into armies and labor pools often occurred as a consequence of war or pestilence when many children were left parentless. Abandoned children then became the wards of the state, military organization, or religious group. When this practice happened en masse, it had the advantage of ensuring the strength and continuity of cultural and religious practices in medieval society.

Early Modern Europe saw the rise of foundling homes and increased abandonment of children to these homes. These numbers continued to rise and peaked when 5% of all births resulted in abandonment in France around 1830. The national reaction to this was to limit the resources provided by foundling homes and switch to foster homes instead such that fewer children would die within overcrowded foundling homes during infancy. As access to contraception increased and economic conditions improved in Europe towards the end of the 19th century, the number of children being abandoned declined.

Abandonment increased towards the end of the 19th century, particularly in the United States. The largest migration of abandoned children in history occurred in the United States between 1853 and 1929. Over one hundred and twenty thousand orphans (not all of whom were intentionally abandoned) were shipped west on railroad cars, where families agreed to foster the children in exchange for their use as farmhands, household workers, etc. Orphan trains were highly popular as a source of free labor. The sheer size of the displacement and the complications and exploitation that occurred gave rise to new agencies and a series of laws that promoted adoption rather than indenture. By 1945, adoption was formulated as a legal act with consideration of the child's best interests. The origin of the move toward secrecy and the sealing of all adoption and birth records began when Charles Loring Brace introduced the concept to prevent children from the orphan trains from returning to or being reclaimed by their parents.

Notable contemporary instances of child abandonment include homicidal neglect by confinement of infants or children, such as in the affair of the Osaka child abandonment case or the affair of two abandoned children in Calgary, Alberta, Canada by their mother Rie Fujii.

== Current situation ==
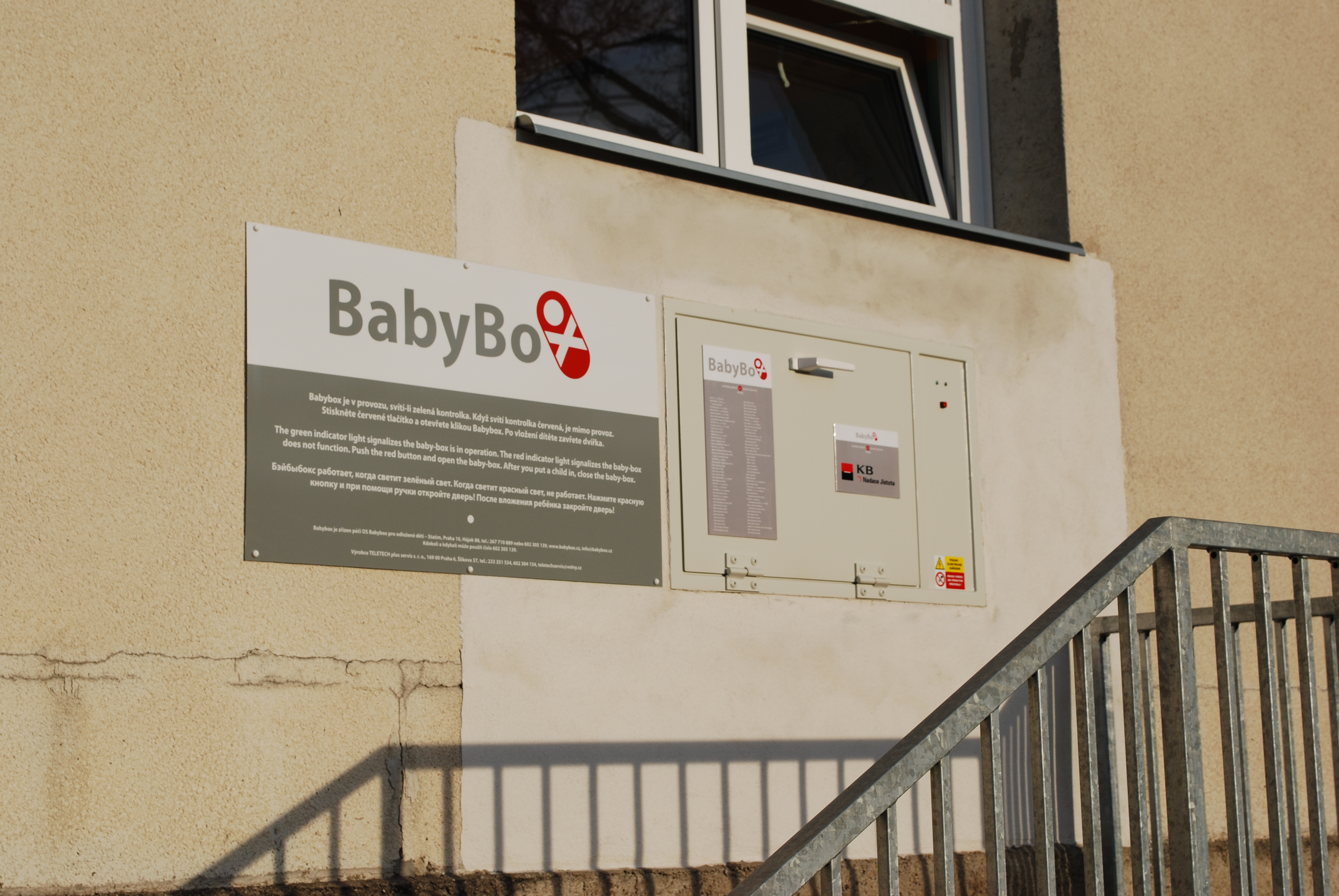
A modern Baby box or Baby hatch in the Czech Republic where a baby can be anonymously abandoned while ensuring that the child will be cared for.

Today, abandonment of a child is considered to be a serious crime in many jurisdictions because it can be considered malum in se (wrong in itself) due to the direct harm to the child, and because of welfare concerns (in that the child often becomes a ward of the state). For example, in the U.S. state of Georgia, it is a misdemeanor to willfully and voluntarily abandon a child, and a felony to abandon one's child and leave the state. In 1981, this distinction was upheld as constitutional by the U.S. Supreme Court against a parent's argument that it denied parents the right to travel and thereby denied parents the equal protection of the laws. 'Rehoming' is still legal in Arkansas where, in 2015, state legislator Justin Harris made national headlines by rehoming two young adopted children.

Many jurisdictions have exceptions to abandonment laws in the form of safe haven laws, which apply to babies left in designated places such as hospitals (see, for example, baby hatch).

In the UK, abandoning a child under the age of two years is a criminal offence. In 2004, 49 babies were abandoned nationwide with slightly more boys than girls being abandoned.

Abandonment is rife in Malaysia, where between 2005 and 2011, 517 babies were dumped. Of those 517 children, 287 were found dead. In 2012, there were 31 cases, including at least one instance of a child being tossed from a window of a high rise apartment.

Persons in cultures with poor social welfare systems who are not financially capable of taking care of a child are more likely to abandon them. Several American states are moving towards passing legislation to prevent rehoming of children post adoption. However, national legislation may be needed to protect children from being rehomed in all states.

=== State programs for facilitating anonymous child abandonment ===
- Anonymous birthing allows pregnant mothers to give birth to their child without revealing their identity or claiming any ownership over or legal obligation to the child. Different countries wait varying lengths of time from 2–8 weeks before putting the child up for adoption to allow mothers to return to the hospital and reclaim the child. Anonymous birthing is most often implemented as measure to prevent neonaticide and has been successful in multiple countries. Police in Austria report a 57% drop in neonaticides after the country passed a law allowing for anonymous birthing and free delivery in 2001. Anonymous birthing provides the opportunity for mothers to disclose relevant health history to later be shared with the child and adoptive family, as well as access to hospital care to reduce risk during birth. In some states, France for example, mothers who choose anonymous birthing undergo counselling and are informed of available support structures to help them keep the child. Mothers who are seeking to anonymously abandon their child at birth may avoid anonymous birthing due to increased interaction with hospital staff and the possibility of undergoing counselling.
- Baby boxes provide a safe and anonymous way to abandon children, typically newborns, rather than resorting to infant exposure or neonaticide. Baby boxes can be found in Austria, Belgium, Czech Republic, Germany, Hungary, Italy, Latvia, Lithuania, Poland, Portugal, Slovakia, South Korea, and the United States. Advantages of baby boxes include a greater degree of anonymity for parents abandoning their children and a guarantee that the child will be found and attended to. However, children are sometimes placed in baby boxes with existing issue or injury and baby boxes are under-utilized and costly to operate. It is also debated if baby boxes are an accessible option for rural mothers who may not be willing to travel to abandon their children.
- Safe haven laws allow parents of a child, typically a newborn child but age can vary, to abandon the child at a place of local authority such as a hospital, fire station, or police station with no further question. Some states allow the parent to reclaim the child within a certain timeframe. Safe Haven Laws passed in the United States in 1999 and have since been adopted in Canada, Japan, France, and Slovakia. It is debated if safe haven laws prevent child abandonment or neonaticide. As with baby boxes, one study suggests that mothers in rural areas are not willing to travel to abandon their children and would not be willing to travel to a hospital to do so. As of 2017, 3,317 babies have been surrendered via safe haven laws in the United States.

== National law and effects on child abandonment ==
China's One Child Policy: In 1979, China introduced its one-child policy which set up penalties for families that chose to have more than one child. Women were compelled to undergo a surgical implantation of an IUD following the birth of their first child and tubal ligation if they were to have another child. Families that disobeyed the law were levied a fine and lost their right to many government services, including access to health and educational services. Nevertheless, transgressions of the law most certainly occurred. Consequently, over the course of over three decades, hundreds of thousands of children, the majority of which were girls, were abandoned and required caretaking. Non-governmental organizations stepped in to assist with the re-housing of these girls, leading to the international adoption of over 120,000 Chinese children. Today, China's fertility rate has not quite returned to the rate of replacement (the birth rate that will maintain population size under conditions of zero net immigration/emigration). In fact, in the years since the relinquishing of the policy, China's fertility rate has only risen .04 per family.

Vietnam War: During and following the Vietnam War, it is estimated that roughly 50,000 babies were born of American fathers and Vietnamese mothers. A large contingent of these children were either unwanted due to the circumstances of their conception or unable to be cared for due to the lack of available resources and assistance in the war-torn country. Locally, these children were known as "children of the dust." Operation Babylift was established by the US government in an effort to bring over 3,300 children, many, but not all, of whom were abandoned, orphaned, or mixed-race, leading to fears of their exploitation, to Western countries to be adopted, with varying degrees of success. Non-governmental organizations attempted to alleviate the problem by setting up international adoptions and other rehoming methods but were largely ineffective. To this day, attempts are being made to link American veterans to children that they may have fathered during their time in Vietnam as well as children to their families in Vietnam.

Romania under Nicolae Ceaușescu: During the rule of Communist politician Nicolae Ceaușescu, Romania underwent drastic changes to its populace. Ceaușescu, in an attempt to form a robust and young population, outlawed methods of contraception and encouraged the creation of large families with many children. Much like during the Fascist period of Italian history, incentives and cultural praise were offered to parents who produced many children. Ceaușescu established Decree 770 which outlawed abortion and contraception for all women, except those who were over 40, had already borne 4–5 children, had life-threatening complications during pregnancy, or who became pregnant through rape or incest. In the following years, Romania's birth rate nearly doubled. However, due to a lack of resources necessary to care for the abundance of children, thousands were abandoned or left to die. Other women resorted to unsafe forms of abortion carried out by people without medical training. The problem persisted until Ceaușescu was overthrown in 1989. Following the revolution, Romania's birthrate steadily declined for the following decades. Today, the birth rate has dropped to 1.52 births per woman, under the rate of replacement.

== In literature ==
Foundlings, who may be orphans, can combine many advantages to a plot: mysterious antecedents, leading to plots to discover them; high birth and lowly upbringing. Foundlings have appeared in literature in some of the oldest known tales. The most common reasons for abandoning children in literature are oracles that the child will cause harm; the mother's desire to conceal her illegitimate child, often after rape by a god; or spite on the part of people other than the parents, such as sisters and mothers-in-law in such fairy tales as The Dancing Water, the Singing Apple, and the Speaking Bird. In some chivalric romances, such as Le Fresne and the Swan-Children, in the variant Beatrix, some children of a multiple birth are abandoned after the heroine has taunted another woman with a claim that such a birth is proof of adultery and then suffered such a birth of her own. Poverty usually features as a cause only with the case of older children, who can survive on their own. Indeed, most such individuals are of royal or noble birth; their abandonment means they grow up in ignorance of their true social status.

=== Abandonment ===
One of the earliest surviving examples of child abandonment in literature is that of Oedipus, who is left to die as a baby in the hills by a herdsman ordered to kill the baby, but is found and grows up to unwittingly marry his biological mother.

In a common variant on the abandonment and rediscovery of an infant, the biblical story of Moses describes how the Jewish infant is abandoned by his mother and set to float in the Nile in a reed basket, in hopes that he will be found and nurtured; as planned, the child is discovered and adopted by the queen of Egypt, thus gaining a higher social status and better education, as well as a more powerful position than his birth family could have given him. A similar story is told of other heroes who eventually learn about their true origins only as adults, when they find they are able to save their original parents or family by wielding power from their adoptive status, while making use of an education that sets them apart from their peers. The theme is also carried through in the case of many modern superheroes, most famously Superman (see Modern Media below). Mark Twain tweaks the traditional "upgrading" of the foundling's social status by having the child's twin, who is powerful by birth, experience the "downgrading " of his position in a switch planned by the two children, in "The Prince and the Pauper".

In many tales, such as Snow White, the child is actually abandoned by a servant who had been given orders to put the child to death. Other tales such as Hansel and Gretel has children reluctantly abandoned in the forest by their parents since they were no longer able to feed them.

Children are often abandoned with birth tokens, which act as plot devices to ensure that the child can be identified. This theme is a main element in Angelo F. Coniglio's historical fiction novella The Lady of the Wheel, in which the title refers to a "receiver of foundlings" who were placed in a device called a "foundling wheel", in the wall of a church or hospital.

In Shakespeare's The Winter's Tale, a recognition scene in the final act reveals by these that Perdita is a king's daughter rather than a shepherdess, and is suitable for her prince lover. Similarly, when the heroine of Le Fresne reveals the brocade and the ring she was abandoned with, her mother and sister recognize her; this makes her a suitable bride for the man whose mistress she had been.

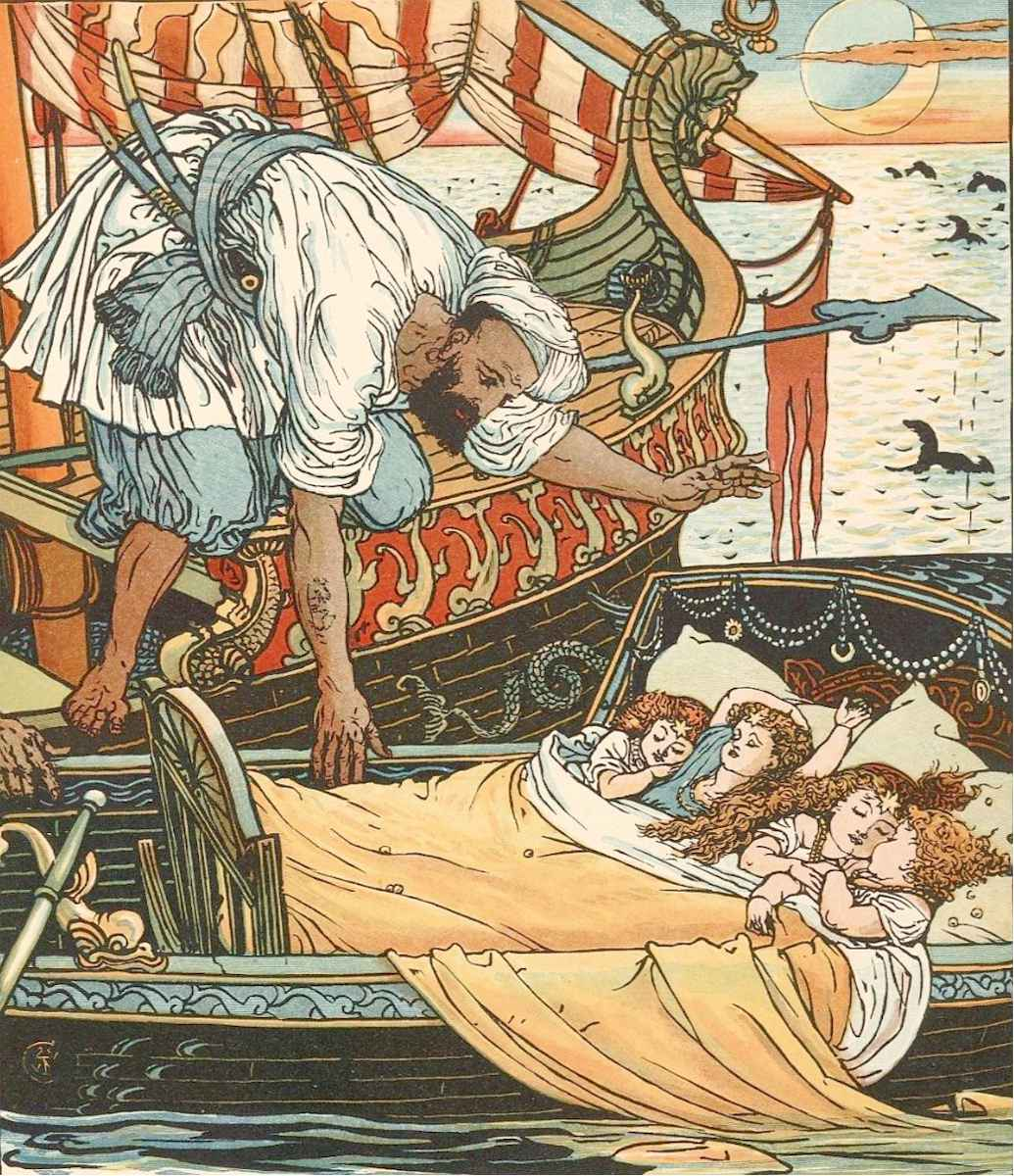
The children of Queen Blondine and of her sister, Princess Brunette, picked up by a Corsair after seven days at sea; illustration by Walter Crane to the fairy tale Princess Belle-Etoile.

From Oedipus onward, Greek and Roman tales are filled with exposed children who escaped death to be reunited with their families—usually, as in Longus' Daphnis and Chloe, more happily than in Oedipus' case. Grown children, having been taken up by strangers, were usually recognized by tokens that had been left with the exposed baby: In Euripides's Ion, Creüsa is about to kill Ion, believing him to be her husband's illegitimate child, when a priestess reveals the birth-tokens that show that Ion is her own, abandoned infant.

This may reflect the widespread practice of child abandonment in their cultures. On the other hand, the motif is continued through literature where the practice is not widespread. William Shakespeare used the abandonment and discovery of Perdita in The Winter's Tale, as noted above, and Edmund Spenser reveals in the last Canto of Book 6 of The Faerie Queene that the character Pastorella, raised by shepherds, is in fact of noble birth. Henry Fielding, in one of the first novels recognized as such, recounted The History of Tom Jones, a Foundling. In the case of Quasimodo, the eponymous character in Victor Hugo's The Hunchback of Notre-Dame, the disfigured child is abandoned at the cathedral's foundling's bed, made available for the leaving of unwanted infants. Ruth Benedict, in studying the Zuni, found that the practice of child abandonment was unknown, but featured heavily in their folktales.

Still, even cultures that do not practice it may reflect older customs; in medieval literature, such as Sir Degaré and Le Fresne, the child is abandoned immediately after birth, which may reflect pre-Christian practices, both Scandavian and Roman, that the newborn would not be raised without the father's decision to do so.

=== Upbringing ===
The strangers who take up the child are often shepherds or other herdsmen. This befell not only Oedipus, but also Cyrus II of Persia, Amphion and Zethus and several of the characters listed above. Romulus and Remus were suckled by a wolf in the wilderness, but afterward, again found by a shepherd. This ties this motif in with the genre of the pastoral. This can imply or outright state that the child benefits by this pure upbringing by unspoiled people, as opposed to the corruption that surrounded their birth family.

Often, the child is aided by animals before being found; Artemis sent a bear to nurse the abandoned Atalanta, and Paris was also nursed by a bear before being found. In some cases, the child is depicted as being raised by animals; however, in actuality, feral children have proven to have difficulty learning speech.

The theme of young boys being raised by leading women of the early Mongol Empire is prominent in sources such as the Secret History of the Mongols. For example, the young Shigi Qutuqu was found wandering a destroyed Tatar camp, he was taken to either Genghis Khan's wife Börte or mother Hoelun to be raised.

=== In adulthood ===
The pattern of a child remaining with its adoptive parents is less common than the reverse, but it occurs. In the Indian epic Mahabharata, Karna is never reconciled with his mother, and dies in battle with her legitimate son. In the Grimm fairy tale Foundling-Bird, Foundling Bird never learns of, least of all reunites with, his parents. George Eliot depicted the abandonment of the character Eppie in Silas Marner; despite learning her true father at the end of the book, she refuses to leave Silas Marner, who had actually reared her.

When the cause of the abandonment is a prophecy, the abandonment is usually instrumental in causing the prophecy to be fulfilled. Besides Oedipus, Greek legends also included Telephus, who was prophesied to kill his uncle; his ignorance of his parentage, stemming from his abandonment, caused his uncle to jeer at him and him to kill the uncle in anger.

=== Older children ===
When older children are abandoned in fairy tales, while poverty may be cited as a cause, as in Hop o' My Thumb, also called Thumbelina, the most common effect is when poverty is combined with a stepmother's malice, as in Hansel and Gretel (or sometimes, a mother's malice). The stepmother's wishes may be the sole cause, as in Father Frost. In these stories, the children seldom find adoptive parents, but malicious monsters, such as ogres and witches; outwitting them, they find treasure enough to solve their poverty. The stepmother may die coincidentally, or be driven out by the father when he hears, so that the reunited family can live happily in her absence.

In a grimmer variation, the tale Babes in the Wood features a wicked uncle in the role of the wicked stepmother, who gives an order for the children to be killed. However, although the servants scruple to obey him, and the children are abandoned in the woods, the tale ends tragically: the children die, and their bodies are covered with leaves by robins.

=== In modern media ===
Foundlings still appear in modern literature; this is a partial list of examples:

- In George Bernard Shaw's stage play Major Barbara, industrialist Andrew Undershaft, a foundling himself, intently searches for a foundling to assume the family business.
- Superman may be seen as a continuation of the foundling tradition, the lone survivor of an advanced (but almost-completely extinct) civilization who is found and raised by Kansas farmers in a pastoral setting, and later discovers his alien origins and uses his powers for good.
- Charlie Chaplin's movie The Kid revolves about the Tramp's efforts to raise an abandoned child.
- In the graphic novel Aqua Leung, the main protagonist is a prince who is whisked out of a castle under attack in a basket-like device and then found by a couple and raised on land so that his father's enemies do not find him. He returns to the seas to fulfill the prophecy thought to be his father's but that was actually his.
- Elora Danan, in the film Willow, and Lir, in the novel The Last Unicorn, both continue the tradition of foundlings abandoned because of prophecies, and who fulfil the prophecies because of their abandonment.
- In the last book of The Chronicles of Prydain, Dallben reveals to the hero Taran that he is a foundling; in a story set in the same world, "The Foundling," Dallben himself proves to be a foundling as well.
- The protagonist Thorby of Robert A. Heinlein's 1957 novel Citizen of the Galaxy is a foundling sold as a slave on a remote planet. He is bought and freed by a beggar who educates and inspires him, then learns from multiple kind foster families. He later discovers that his parents were killed for opposing slavery in the galactic conglomerate that they owned and that he inherits, and he carries on their work.
- The character Leela from Futurama was a foundling, given to the Ophanarium and a note in an alien language to make people believe that she was an alien rather than a mutant; she would have been forced, in the latter case, to live in the sewers with the other mutants.
- Several foundlings appear in Terry Pratchett's Discworld: most notably Captain Carrot Ironfoundersson, who was found, as a toddler, among the ruins of a caravan party that had been attacked by bandits, and was then surrounded by the bodies of the adults.
- The character of Mozzie, from White Collar, is a foundling, left in a basket with only a bear.
- In some cartoons, wily characters may disguise themselves as foundlings. This may be accomplished by the character dressing as a baby and lying in a bassinet or basket on a doorstep, perhaps with a note adding to the ruse. This was parodied in the 2006 movie Little Man.
- In The Flintstones, Bamm-Bamm was abandoned on the Rubbles's doorstep and eventually adopted by them.

== See also ==
- Abandoned child syndrome
- Abandonment (emotional)
- Barrel children
- Borderline personality disorder
- Coin-operated-locker babies
- Feral child
- Lost boys (polygamy)
- Myling
- Neonatal abandonment in Japan
- Project Cuddle
- Safe-haven law
- Street children
- Unintended pregnancy
- Baby hatch
- Foundling hospital
