= Rie Fujii =

Japanese woman (born 1978)

Rie Fujii (藤井 理絵, Fujii Rie) (born 1978 in Tsuwano, Shimane) is a Japanese woman who abandoned her two infant children in an apartment in Calgary, Alberta while she visited her boyfriend. On her return ten days later, she found both children dead.

Fujii arrived in Canada in April 1997, planning to study English. In 1998 she moved in with a boyfriend, Peter Brown. The following year, her visa about to expire, Fujii returned to Japan. Some months later, she returned to Canada, this time on a tourist visa. On February 9, 2000, Fujii gave birth to a son, Domenic Ryu Brown. Although her visa expired, she continued to stay in Canada illegally. On February 24, 2001, Fujii gave birth to daughter Gemini Brown; between February and March, Fujii resided at an emergency shelter in Calgary, until beginning a relationship with a new boyfriend, Chris Knowler. On April 10, Fujii and her two children moved into an apartment on 14th Avenue South East; Fujii began leaving the children at home alone, sometimes overnight, while visiting Knowler's apartment. In May, Knowler moved out of his apartment, stayed with Fujii and her children for a few days, and then moved to his father's residence in Cochrane, Alberta.

On May 8, Fujii left her two children alone in her apartment, with a bottle for each child, to visit Knowler in Cochrane. She stayed ten days, during which time both children died of starvation. On her return to her 14th Avenue apartment, Fujii discovered her children's bodies. She placed Gemini's body in a plastic bag, which she threw in a dumpster, leaving Domenic's body in the apartment. Two days later, she returned to Cochrane and stayed with Knowler for four days, returning for a further seven days at the end of May. On June 5, 2001, Pritpal Sandhu, the owner of the apartment, having received no response to an eviction notice, contacted police after opening the unit's door and smelling rotting flesh. Fujii was arrested on June 6. She was sentenced to eight years in prison for manslaughter; she was denied parole in 2004.

According to the summary of the case published in the Criminal Case Bulletin,

the 24 year old female offender, with no previous criminal record, left her two infant children alone for 10 days while she was with her boyfriend. The children, aged 3 months and 15 months, died of dehydration or starvation. She disposed of one body. When the other was discovered, she told the police a lie about the other. Eventually the truth came out.

After her sentencing a psychiatrist testified that Fujii seemed happy that her children were dead. Fujii was deported to Japan in 2006, after serving five years of her sentence.

== See also ==
- The four abandoned children of Sugamo
- The two abandoned children of Osaka, a very similar story wherein two children were sealed in an Osaka apartment to die of starvation
- Louise Porton, another similar story in the United Kingdom wherein two children were murdered by their mother so she could continue her sex life
