= Divine apathy =

Religious doctrine

Divine apathy, in Christian theology, refers to the belief that God is impassible, meaning He is not subject to suffering, pain, or the influence of human emotions and passions. This concept is rooted in the idea that God, as a perfect being, is beyond the reach of earthly experiences and emotional changes that characterize human life. It derives from classical theism, which portrays God as immutable, eternal, and transcendent. It is distinguished from apatheia in Eastern Orthodox Christianity, which refers to a state of being free from passions and desires, a concept more focused on human spiritual development.

== Historical development ==
The doctrine of divine apathy has been a subject of theological debate throughout the history of Christianity. Early Church Fathers, such as Augustine of Hippo and Thomas Aquinas, contributed significantly to the development of this idea. They argued that God's impassibility does not mean He is indifferent to human affairs, but rather, He is above all human emotions and unaffected by them in His divine essence.

The concept has been both defended and critiqued. Defenders assert that divine apathy is essential to God's perfection, arguing that susceptibility to change or suffering would imply imperfection. Critics argue that this concept makes God seem distant and unrelatable to human experiences. They suggest that a God who experiences emotions, like love and compassion, is more consistent with the Biblical portrayal of a God deeply involved in human life.
