= Abandoned child syndrome =

- Specialty: Psychiatry

Abandoned child syndrome is a proposed behavioral or psychological condition that is said to result from the loss of one or both parents. Abandonment may be physical or emotional; that is, the parent may abandon the child by failing to be present in their life, or by withholding affection, nurturing, or stimulation. As a result, abandoned children may also suffer physical trauma, which may stem from factors such as neglect, malnutrition, starvation, and abuse. Furthermore, abandonment may be either intentional or non-intentional; the parent may willingly leave the child, or they may be alienated from the child by force. Forced separation of a parent from their child may stem from a number of potential causes, including (but not limited to) alienation following a divorce, placement of the child in foster care, or political conflicts. With the nurture and support of a "facilitative environment", the child can develop the ability to cope with the trial of abandonment.

Abandoned child syndrome is not currently recognized as a mental disorder in popular medical manuals like the ICD-10, DSM-IV, or DSM-5.

== Signs and symptoms ==
Symptoms may be physical or mental, and may extend into adulthood and perhaps throughout a person's life. These symptoms can show themselves differently in childhood and in adulthood.

Adults that have experienced abandonment often display negative behaviors in current relationships. Among these symptoms include issues with intimacy, relationship sabotage, insecurity, codependency, being a "people pleaser", etc. This can cause the attachment style of the adult to change as they get older, such as an anxious attachment style. This can cause these adults to constantly worry that their friends or partners are going to constantly leave them, always trying to please others, giving too much into romantic relationships, not understanding boundaries, constantly looking for signs of uneasiness in others, staying in a toxic relationship because of fear of loneliness, and many more.

In children, transient separation anxiety is a normal part of their development and is usually experienced between 10 and 18 months; however, it will not develop when the child experiences abandonment from birth, there being no connection to become separated from, or anxious about. It is common to end around the age of 3, but can be concerning when the symptoms of separation anxiety occur for an extended period of time. This can lead children to manifest symptoms such as a worry of being abandoned, feeling anxious when dropped off at a daycare, school, or family member's house, clinginess, or even being ill but not showing the physical attributes of being ill. Children who have experienced the loss of a caregiver or parent may also experience more drastic symptoms in their life such as an addiction to drugs or harmful substances, eating disorders, and self-harmful thoughts and actions. Adopted children may display unique symptoms of abandonment such as aggression, withdrawal, depression, sleeping troubles, etc.

== Causes ==
When children are raised without the psychological or physical protection they need, they may internalize a substantial amount of fear, which is also referred to as chronic loss. Not receiving the necessary psychological or physical protection results in abandonment. If children live with repeated abandonment, these experiences can cause shame. Shame arises from the painful message implied in abandonment: "You are not important. You are not of value." This is the pain from which people need to heal. As the child grows older, these internalizations can lead to them physically hurting themselves, or getting into drugs and alcohol. Over time they will start to treat the people close to them differently and will become more irritable and angry. Another cause for these internalizations can be the Socio-Economic status of the child's family and the environment they are surrounded with.

== See also ==
- Reactive attachment disorder
