= Barrel children =

Children relinquished by their parents moving abroad

Barrel children are children who are abandoned or "left behind" by their parents who are seeking a better life abroad.

Dr. Claudette Crawford-Brown, the University of the West Indies academic who first described the phenomenon of barrel children, defines "barrel children" as those children who, while waiting in the Caribbean to migrate to their parents in the metropoles of North America and the United Kingdom, receive material resources in the form of food and clothing in lieu of direct care. Dr. Crawford-Brown, in her publication Who Will Save Our Children: The plight of the Jamaican child in the nineties, showed that these children have surrogate parents who are often unable to give them the emotional support and nurturance that they need; most of these children may be instead raised by grandparents or close relatives.

== Emotional impact ==
The impact on these children of this type of neglect includes a range of emotional and behavioural problems including run-away behaviour, withdrawal, depression, and, in some cases, acting-out behaviour. The Trinidad and Tobago News said that for "barrel children the psychological scars have been great and have been troubling factors unto the second, third and fourth generations."

The Wellcome Trust discussed barrel children in an article focusing on violence in the Caribbean, while it was the title and subject of a short film by Cara Elmslie Weir about a Trinidadian family split by migration, the parents "sending barrels full of material goods" from the US to their children in Trinidad.

UNICEF in Jamaica agreed that "Migration of parents who seek more lucrative employment abroad has had a negative impact on Jamaican children. Some children are left in the care of strangers, neighbours or even older siblings who are still children. These so-called “barrel children” are left without parental guidance or adult supervision and with access to significant material resources in the form of cash remittances and barrels of clothing and toys sent by absentee parents."

It has also been discussed in Caribbean Studies Journals, conferences on the Caribbean, the Trinidad Guardian and Trinidad Newsday. Discussing absent parents the Trinidad Guardian noted that "At holiday time, they ship their barrels of love, disguised as brand-name sneakers and clothing, believing that these would make their children happy and make up for them being not around. But the fact remains that children are deprived of the real love of their parents."

== Reportage ==
An article published in Newsweek by Brook Larmar entitled the "Barrel Children" dramatised the problem in its effects on one particular family. "The cardboard barrel has been sitting empty in Marsha Flowers's backyard for more than a month now, but the Jamaican teenager hangs onto it as though it were a sacred totem. And in a way, it is. Five years after her mother immigrated to the United States, leaving Marsha and two sisters to fend for themselves in a Kingston slum, the barrel is one of the few tangible signs of her mother's love - and of her own frustrated desires."

Blogs also exist highlighting the experiences of barrel children. Memories of a Caribbean Barrel Child was created by Dr. Anthony Salandy (a native of Trinidad and Tobago) to shed light of the experiences and outcomes associated with being a barrel child.

== In popular culture ==
The Romanian entry at the Eurovision Song Contest 2015, "De la capăt", lyrically focuses on the story of a child at home whose parents work abroad. The music video tells the story of a boy in Romania whose parents work in Vienna (where the contest was held that year). He and his sister are sent a package from their parents and the boy uses the address on the package to travel to Vienna to see them. A text that in the middle of the video reads: "More than 3 million Romanians are working abroad, trying to make a better life for their children. Unfortunately, the children are left behind."
