= Marseille =

City in southern France

Marseille Marselha (Provençal)
- Prefecture and commune
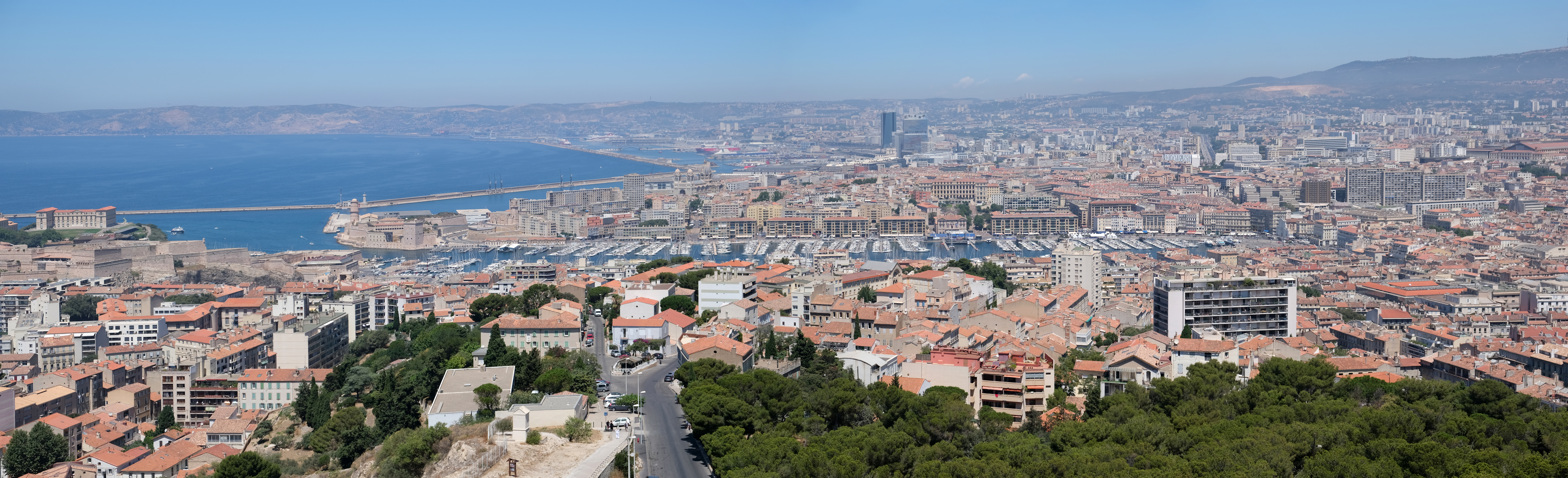
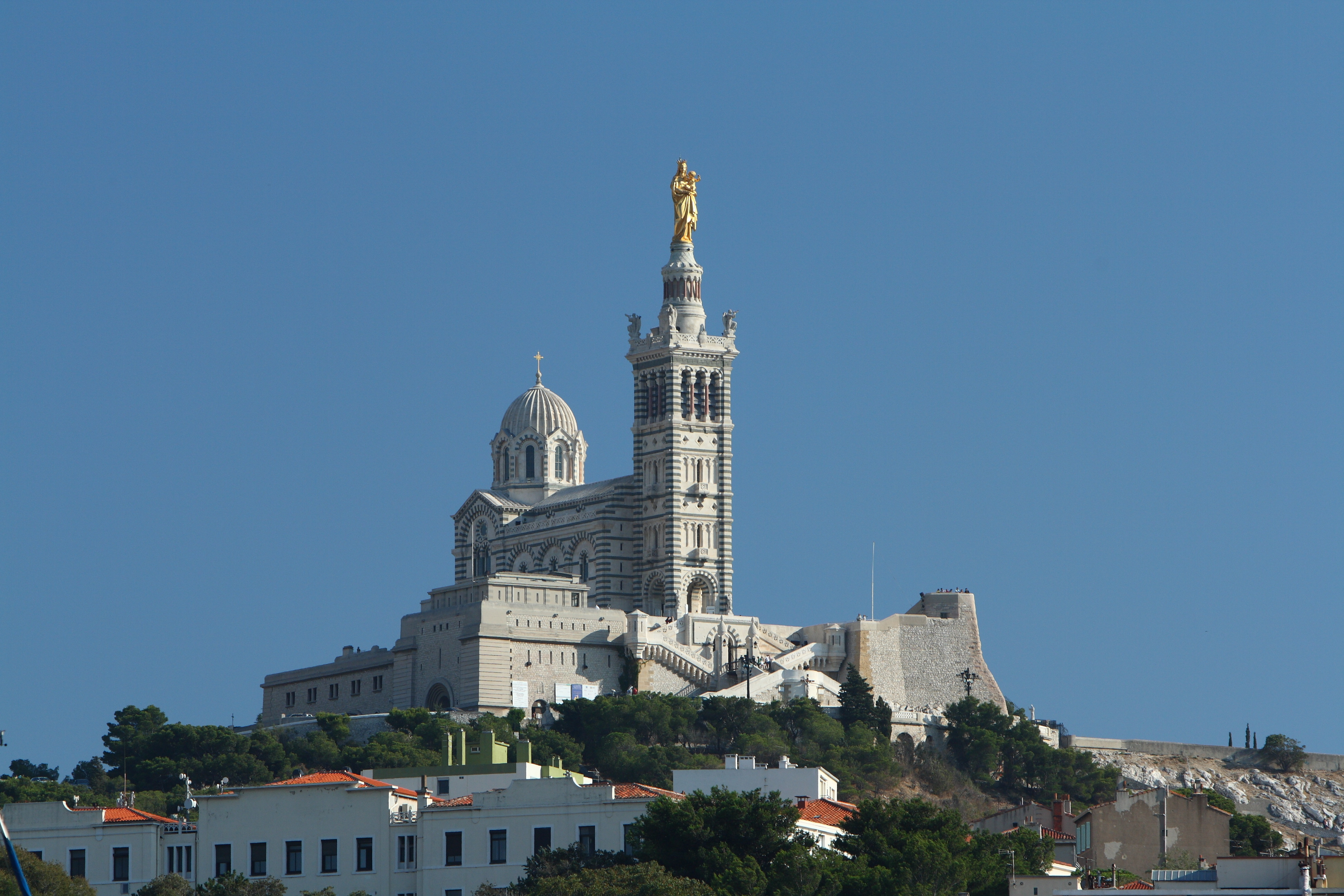
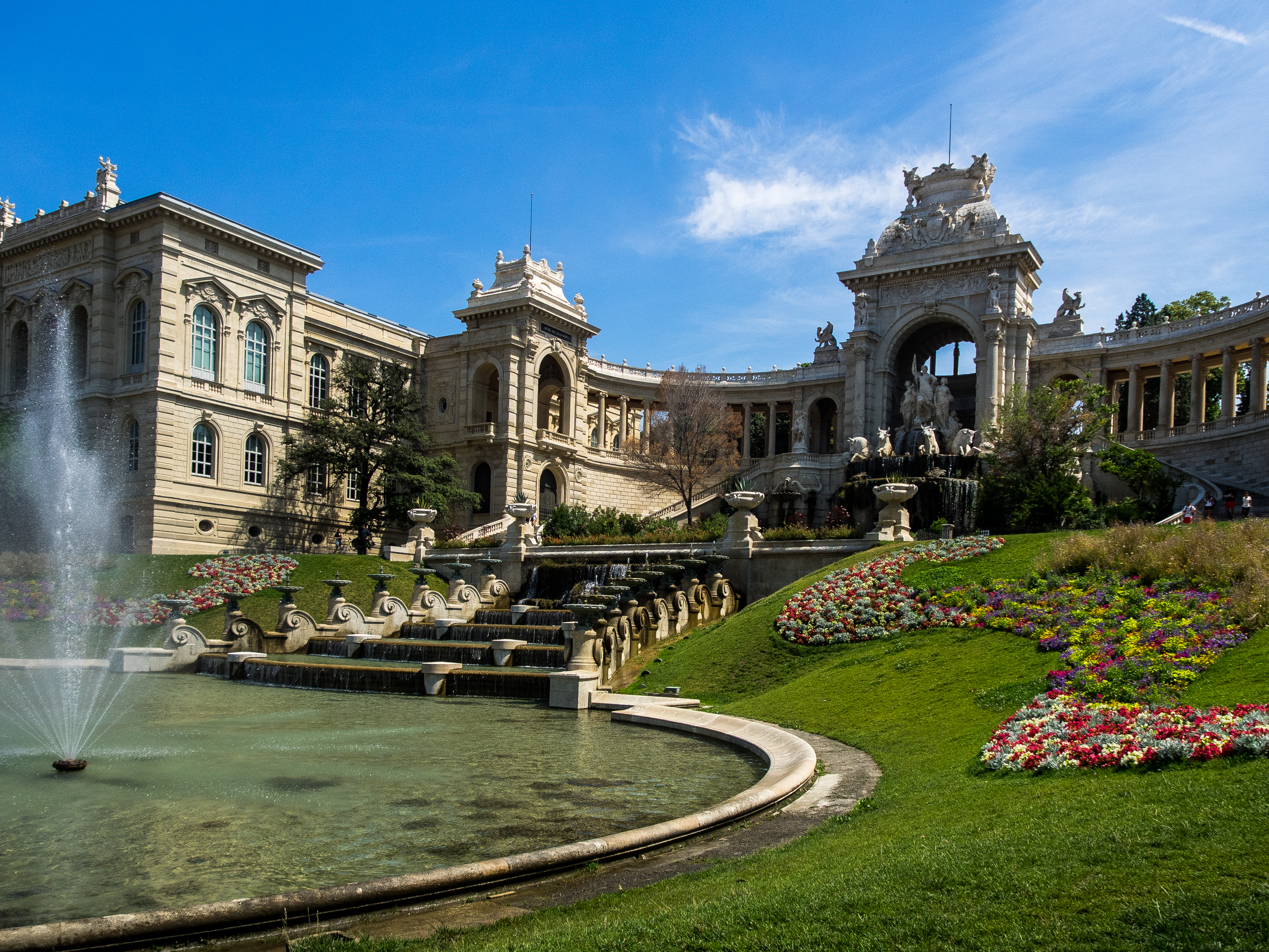
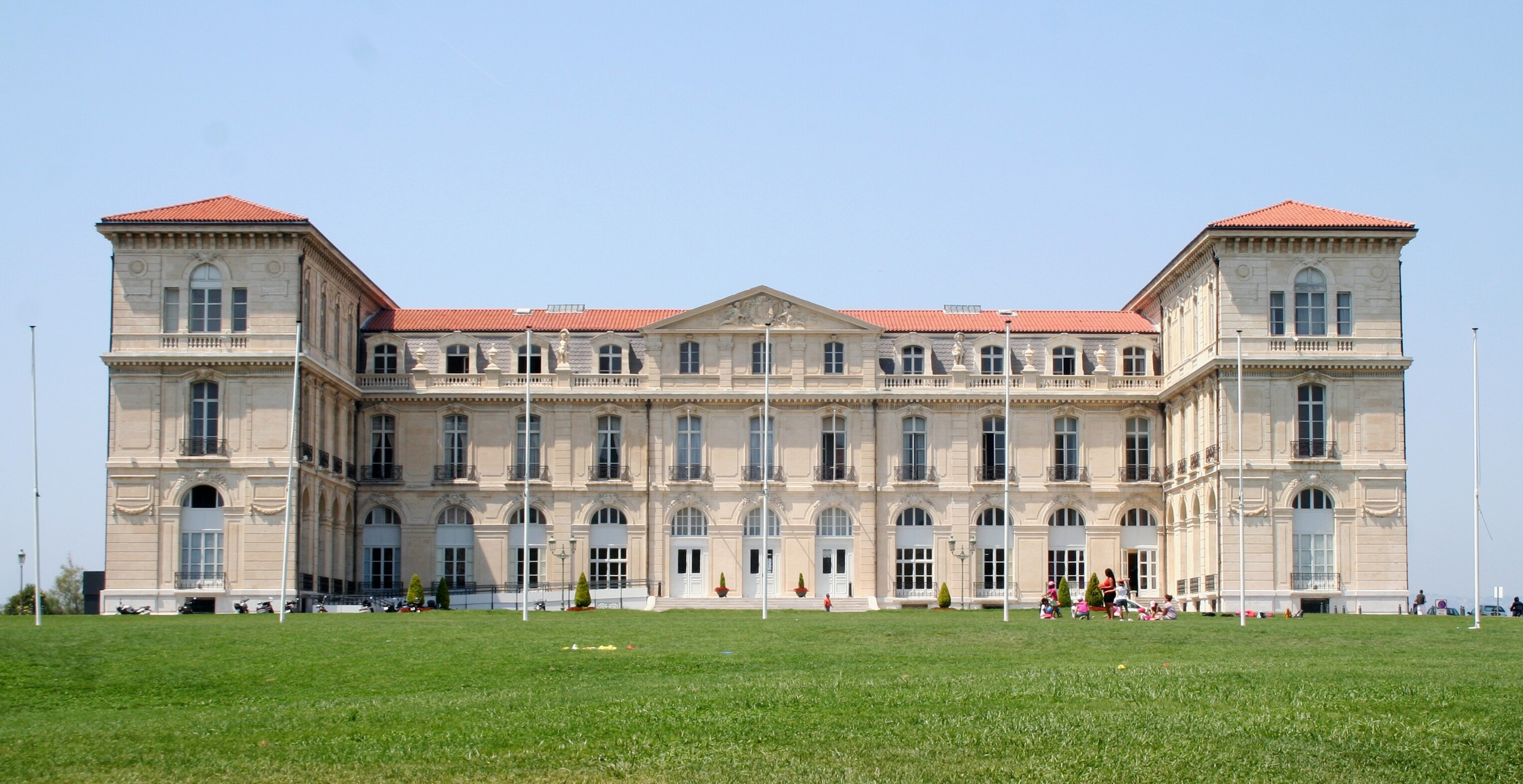
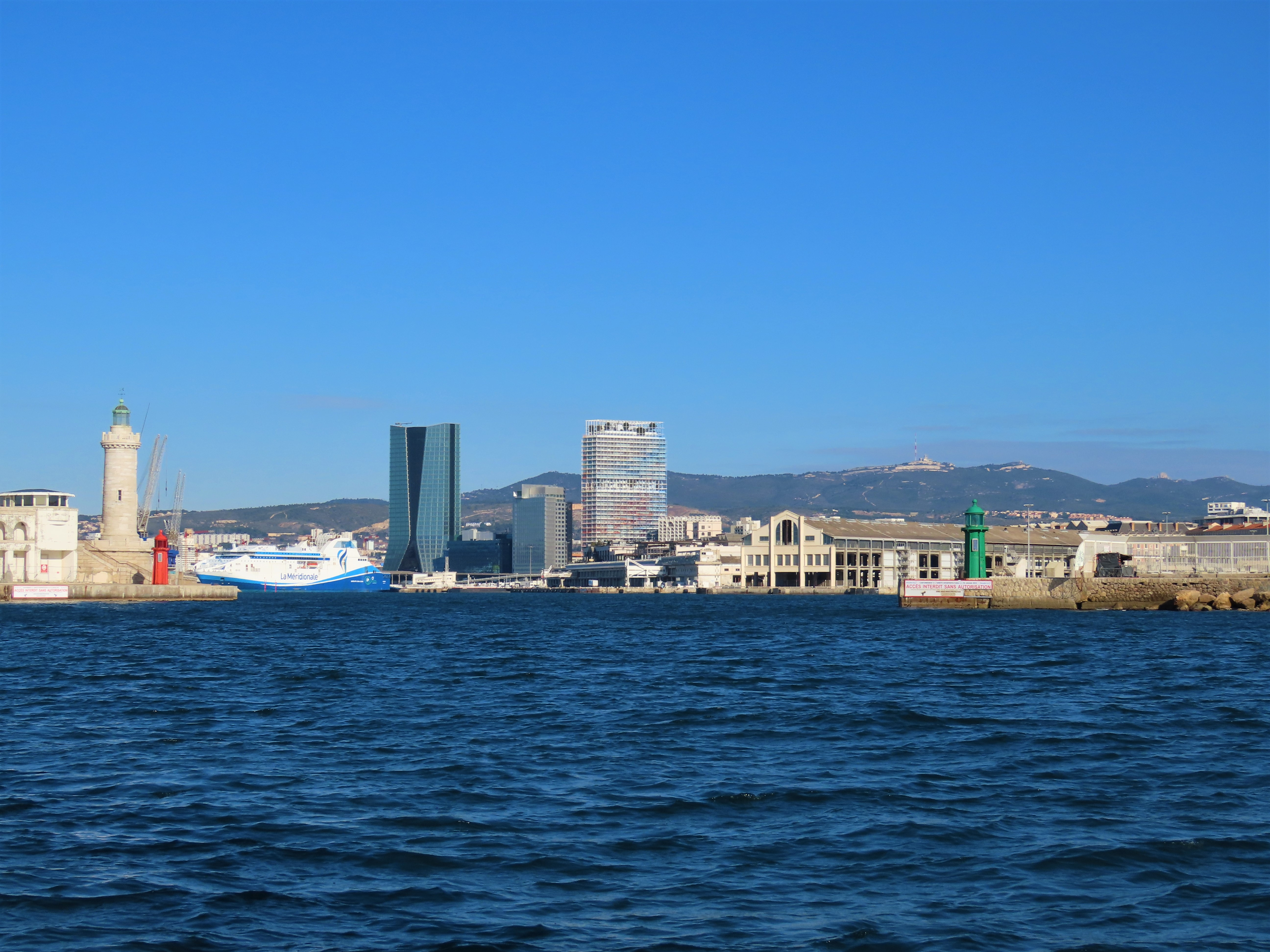
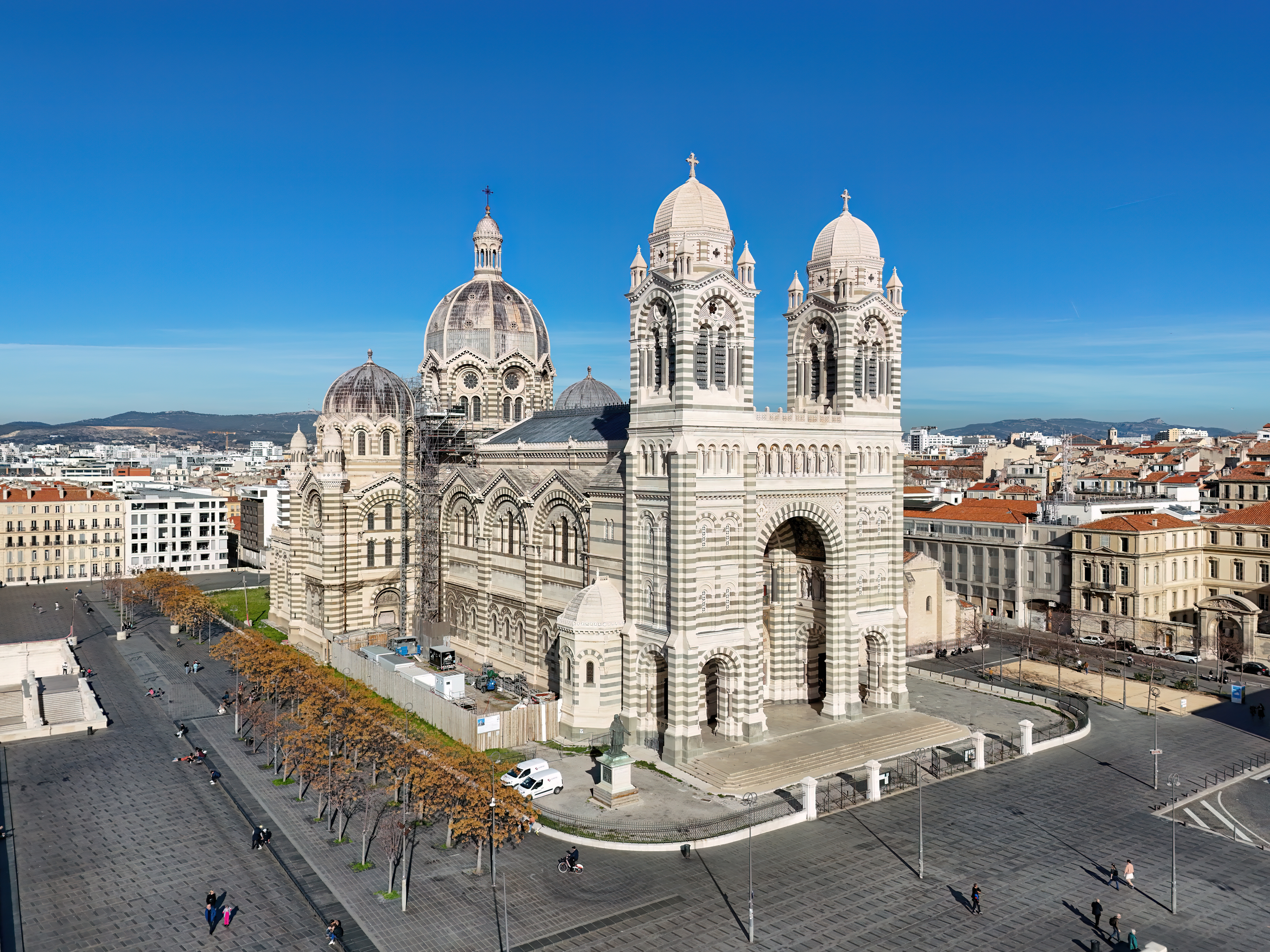
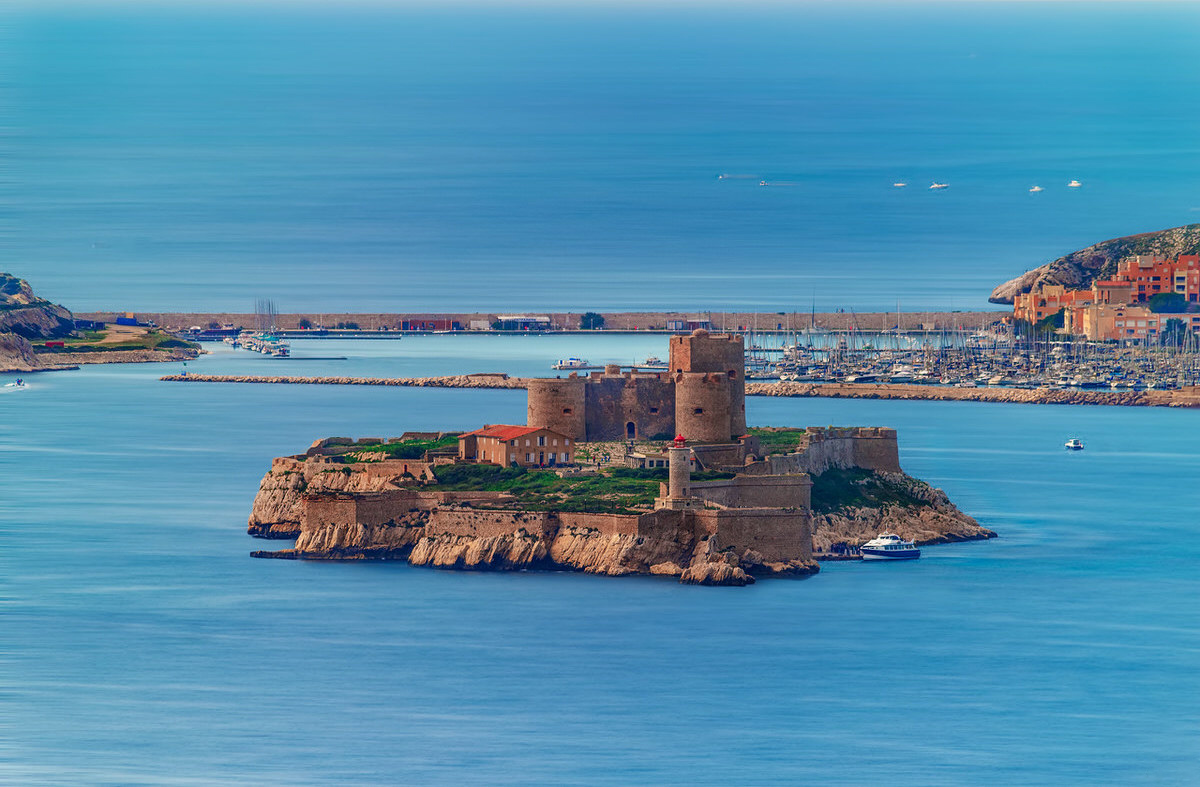
- Old Port seen from Notre-Dame de la Garde Notre-Dame de la Garde Palais Longchamp Palais du Pharo Euroméditerranée Marseille Cathedral Château d'If

- Flag Coat of arms
- Motto(s): Actibus immensis urbs fulget massiliensis "The city of Marseille shines from its great achievements"
- Location of Marseille
- Location within France Location within Provence-Alpes-Côte d'Azur
- Coordinates: 43°17′47″N 5°22′12″E
- Country: France
- Region: Provence-Alpes-Côte d'Azur
- Department: Bouches-du-Rhône
- Arrondissement: Marseille
- Canton: 12 cantons
- Intercommunality: Aix-Marseille-Provence Metropolis
- Subdivisions: 16 arrondissements

Government
  - Mayor (2026–32): Benoît Payan (DVG)
- Area^{1}: 240.62 km^{2} (92.90 sq mi)
  - Urban (2023): 1,758.2 km^{2} (678.8 sq mi)
  - Metro (2023): 3,971.8 km^{2} (1,533.5 sq mi)
- Population (2023): 886,040
  - Rank: 2nd in France
  - Density: 3,682.3/km^{2} (9,537.2/sq mi)
  - Urban (2023): 1,648,953
  - Urban density: 937.86/km^{2} (2,429.1/sq mi)
  - Metro (2023): 1,917,728
  - Metro density: 482.84/km^{2} (1,250.5/sq mi)
- Demonym(s): Marseillais (French); Marselhés (Occitan); Massiliot or Massiliote (ancient)
- Time zone: UTC+01:00 (CET)
  - Summer (DST): UTC+02:00 (CEST)
- INSEE/Postal code: 13055 /13001-13016
- Dialling codes: 0491 or 0496
- Website: marseille.fr
- ^{1} French Land Register data, which excludes lakes, ponds, glaciers > 1 km^{2} (0.386 sq mi or 247 acres) and river estuaries.

Marseille (Note: Formerly conventionally spelled in English as Marseilles.) (Occitan: Marselha) is a city in southern France, the prefecture of the Bouches-du-Rhône department and of the Provence-Alpes-Côte d'Azur region. Situated in Provence, it marks the eastern end of the Côte Bleue on the Mediterranean coast. Marseille is the second-most populous city proper in France, after Paris, with 886,040 people in 2023 over a municipal territory of 241 km^{2} (93 sq mi). Together with its suburbs and exurbs, the Marseille metropolitan area, which extends over 3,972 km^{2} (1,534 sq mi), had a population of 1,917,728 as of 2023. The cities of Marseille, Aix-en-Provence, and 90 suburban municipalities have formed since 2016 the Aix-Marseille-Provence Metropolis, an indirectly elected metropolitan authority now in charge of wider metropolitan issues, with a population of 1,939,077 as of 2023. The southeast of Marseille is in Calanques National Park, making Marseille the only large city in France to have a national park within city limits.

Founded c. 600 BC by Greek settlers, Marseille is the oldest city in France, as well as one of Europe's oldest continuously inhabited settlements. It was known to the ancient Greeks as Massalia and to Romans as Massilia. Marseille has been a trading port since ancient times. It experienced a commercial boom during the colonial period and especially in the 19th century, becoming a prosperous industrial and trading city. The Old Port still lies at the heart of the city, where the manufacture of Marseille soap began some six centuries ago. Overlooking the port is the Notre-Dame de la Garde – known as "la Bonne Mère" by the people of Marseille – a Romano-Byzantine church and a symbol of the city. Today, the Grand Port Maritime de Marseille (GPMM) and the maritime economy play a major role in regional and national economic activity. Marseille remains the first French port, the second Mediterranean port and the fifth European port. Since its origins, Marseille's openness to the Mediterranean Sea has made it a cosmopolitan city marked by cultural and economic exchanges with Southern Europe, the Middle East, North Africa and Asia. In Europe, the city has the third largest Jewish community after London and Paris.

In the 1990s, the Euroméditerranée project for economic development and urban renewal was launched. New infrastructure projects and renovations were carried out in the 2000s and 2010s: the tramway, the renovation of the Hôtel-Dieu into a luxury hotel, the expansion of the Stade Vélodrome, the CMA CGM Tower, as well as other quayside museums such as the Museum of European and Mediterranean Civilisations (MuCEM). As a result, Marseille now has the most museums in France after Paris. The city was named European Capital of Culture in 2013 and European Capital of Sport in 2017. Home of Olympique de Marseille, one of the most successful and widely supported football clubs in France, Marseille has hosted matches at the 1998 FIFA World Cup and UEFA Euro 2016. It is home to several higher education institutions in the region, including the University of Aix-Marseille. A resident of Marseille is a Marseillais.

== Name ==
The name Marseille most likely comes from the name Massalia given to the ancient city initially founded by Greeks. Variations of the name include:

- In English Marseille, or formerly Marseilles, both pronounced /mɑːrˈseɪ/ mar-SAY;
- In French Marseille, which is pronounced [maʁsɛj] in Standard French and [maχˈsɛjə] in local French;
- In Occitan (Provençal) Marselha (pronounced [maʀˈsejɔ, maʀˈsijɔ]) according to the Classical orthographic norm, which may be written Marsiho according to the Mistralian norm, from the Medieval Occitan Marselha or Masselha;
- In Latin Massilia, from the Greek Μασσαλία (Massalía), which is the oldest attestation of the name, since the city was founded by Greek settlers around 600 BC, and remained for a long time a Greek-speaking place even after it fell under Roman rule.

== Geography ==
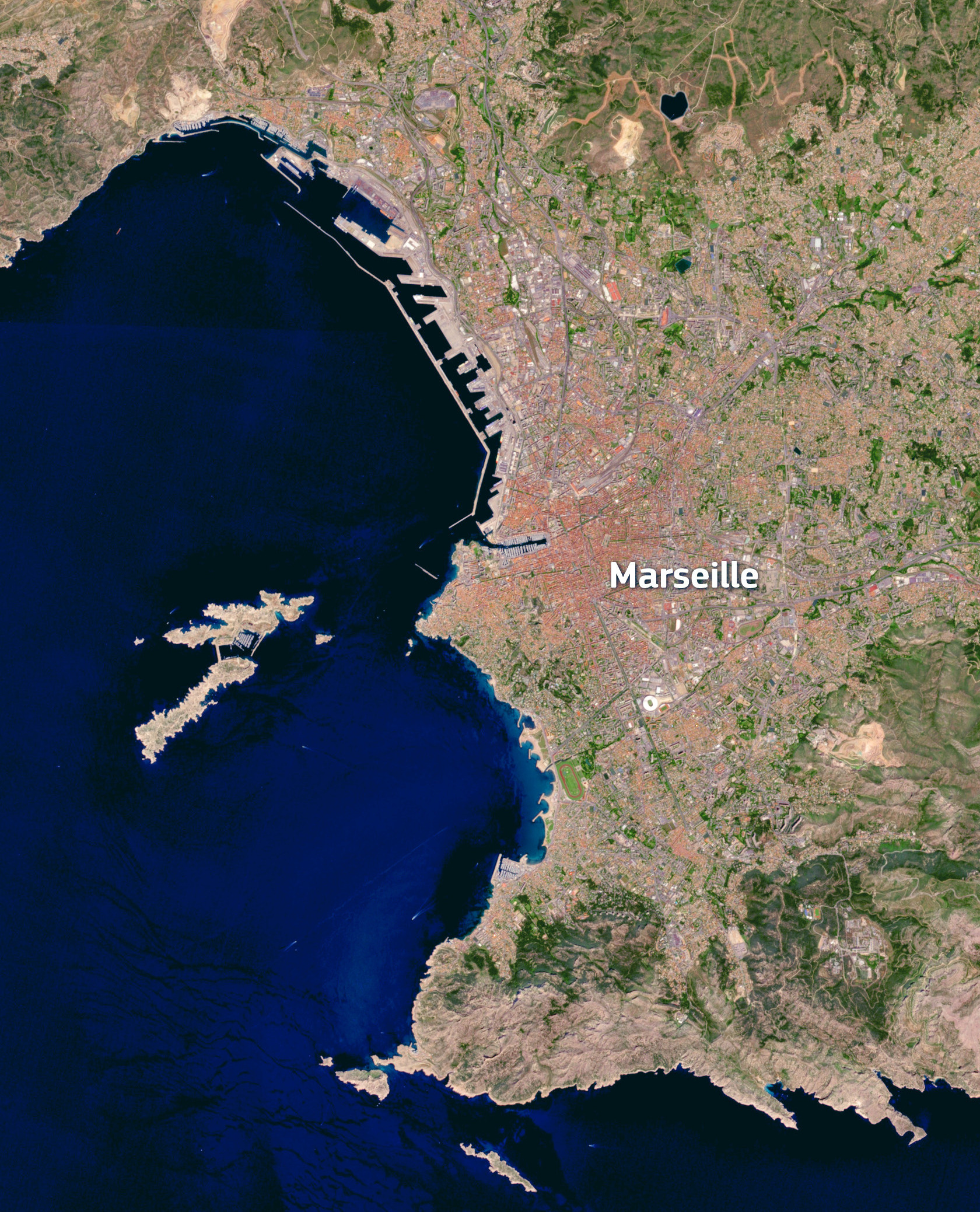
A Sentinel-2 satellite view of Marseille

Marseille is the second-largest metropolitan area in France after Paris. To the east, starting in the small fishing village of Callelongue on the outskirts of Marseille and stretching as far as Cassis, are the Calanques, a rugged coastal area interspersed with small fjord-like inlets. Farther east still are the Sainte-Baume (a 1,147 m (3,763 ft) mountain ridge rising from a forest of deciduous trees), the city of Toulon and the French Riviera. To the north of Marseille, beyond the low Garlaban and Etoile mountain ranges, is the 1,011 m (3,317 ft) Montagne Sainte-Victoire. To the west of Marseille is the former artists' colony of l'Estaque; farther west are the Côte Bleue, the Gulf of Lion and the Camargue region in the Rhône delta. The Marseille Provence Airport lies to the north west of the city at Marignane on the Étang de Berre.

The city's main thoroughfare (the wide boulevard called the Canebière) stretches eastward from the Old Port to the Réformés quarter. Two large forts flank the entrance to the Old Port—Fort Saint-Nicolas (Note: Port Saint-Nicholas is a 17th-century fortress built around the small medieval chapel of Entrecasteaux near the Abbey of St Victor, Marseille.) on the south side and Fort Saint-Jean on the north. Farther out in the Bay of Marseille is the Frioul archipelago which comprises four islands, one of which, If, is the location of Château d'If, made famous by the Dumas novel The Count of Monte Cristo. The main commercial centre of the city intersects with the Canebière at Rue St Ferréol and the Centre Bourse (one of the city's main shopping malls). The centre of Marseille has several pedestrianised zones, most notably Rue St Ferréol, Cours Julien near the Music Conservatory, the Cours Honoré-d'Estienne-d'Orves off the Old Port and the area around the Hôtel de Ville. In 2024, the Cours Julien was named one of the 38 coolest neighborhoods in the world by Time Out. To the south east of central Marseille in the 6th arrondissement are the Prefecture and the monumental fountain of Place Castellane, an important bus and metro interchange. To the south west are the hills of the 7th and 8th arrondissements, dominated by the basilica of Notre-Dame de la Garde. Marseille's main railway station—Marseille-Saint-Charles station—is north of the Centre Bourse in the 1st arrondissement; it is linked by the Boulevard d'Athènes to the Canebière.

=== Climate ===
The city has a hot-summer mediterranean climate (Köppen: Csa) with cool-mild winters with moderate rainfall, because of the wet westerly winds, and hot, mostly dry summers. December, January, and February are the coldest months, averaging temperatures of around 12 °C (54 °F) during the day and 4 °C (39 °F) at night. July and August are the hottest months, averaging temperatures of around 28–30 °C (82–86 °F) during the day and 19 °C (66 °F) at night in the Marignane airport [35 km (22 mi) from Marseille] but in the city near the sea the average high temperature is 27 °C (81 °F) in July.

Marseille receives the most sunlight of any French city, 2,897.6 hours per year on average, while the average sunshine in the country is around 1,950 hours. It is also the driest major city with only 532.3 mm (21 in) of precipitation annually, mainly due to the mistral, a cold, dry wind originating in the Rhône Valley that occurs mostly in winter and spring and which generally brings clear skies and sunny weather to the region. Less frequent is the sirocco, a hot, sand-bearing wind, coming from the Sahara. Snowfalls are infrequent; over 50% of years do not experience a single snowfall.

The hottest temperature was 40.6 °C (105.1 °F) on 26 July 1983 during a great heat wave, the lowest temperature was −16.8 °C (1.8 °F) on 13 February 1929 during a strong cold wave.

Climate data for Marseille-Marignane (Marseille Provence Airport), elevation: 36 m, 1991–2020 normals, extremes 1921–present (Note: The altitude provided from the site varies about 31 m, a much larger value than the margin of error, which may mean that the station was relocated ms in one of the data had maintained the elevation from when measured, which should be used.)
Month	Jan	Feb	Mar	Apr	May	Jun	Jul	Aug	Sep	Oct	Nov	Dec	Year
Record high °C (°F)	19.9 (67.8)	22.5 (72.5)	25.4 (77.7)	29.6 (85.3)	34.9 (94.8)	39.6 (103.3)	39.7 (103.5)	39.2 (102.6)	36.8 (98.2)	30.4 (86.7)	25.2 (77.4)	20.7 (69.3)	39.7 (103.5)
Mean maximum °C (°F)	15.0 (59.0)	16.2 (61.2)	20.1 (68.2)	23.0 (73.4)	27.2 (81.0)	31.9 (89.4)	34.5 (94.1)	34.2 (93.6)	29.8 (85.6)	24.5 (76.1)	19.1 (66.4)	15.7 (60.3)	35.3 (95.5)
Mean daily maximum °C (°F)	11.8 (53.2)	12.8 (55.0)	16.4 (61.5)	19.3 (66.7)	23.5 (74.3)	27.9 (82.2)	30.7 (87.3)	30.5 (86.9)	25.9 (78.6)	21.3 (70.3)	15.7 (60.3)	12.4 (54.3)	20.7 (69.3)
Daily mean °C (°F)	7.7 (45.9)	8.3 (46.9)	11.4 (52.5)	14.3 (57.7)	18.4 (65.1)	22.5 (72.5)	25.2 (77.4)	24.9 (76.8)	20.9 (69.6)	17.0 (62.6)	11.7 (53.1)	8.4 (47.1)	15.9 (60.6)
Mean daily minimum °C (°F)	3.6 (38.5)	3.7 (38.7)	6.5 (43.7)	9.4 (48.9)	13.3 (55.9)	17.2 (63.0)	19.7 (67.5)	19.4 (66.9)	15.9 (60.6)	12.6 (54.7)	7.7 (45.9)	4.4 (39.9)	11.1 (52.0)
Mean minimum °C (°F)	−3.1 (26.4)	−2.1 (28.2)	−0.1 (31.8)	3.2 (37.8)	7.5 (45.5)	11.6 (52.9)	14.5 (58.1)	14.3 (57.7)	10.4 (50.7)	5.9 (42.6)	1.3 (34.3)	−1.9 (28.6)	−4.8 (23.4)
Record low °C (°F)	−12.4 (9.7)	−16.8 (1.8)	−10.0 (14.0)	−2.4 (27.7)	0.0 (32.0)	5.4 (41.7)	7.8 (46.0)	8.1 (46.6)	1.0 (33.8)	−2.2 (28.0)	−5.8 (21.6)	−12.8 (9.0)	−16.8 (1.8)
Average precipitation mm (inches)	47.1 (1.85)	29.8 (1.17)	29.5 (1.16)	51.6 (2.03)	37.7 (1.48)	27.9 (1.10)	10.8 (0.43)	25.8 (1.02)	82.0 (3.23)	73.3 (2.89)	75.9 (2.99)	40.9 (1.61)	532.3 (20.96)
Average precipitation days (≥ 1.0 mm)	5.1	4.6	4.2	5.8	4.4	2.8	1.4	2.7	4.8	5.9	7.0	4.7	53.5
Average snowy days	0.9	0.5	0.0	0.0	0.0	0.0	0.0	0.0	0.0	0.0	0.3	0.2	1.9
Average relative humidity (%)	74.4	72.1	70.5	70.6	71.4	69.7	67.1	68.9	71.4	75.8	75.5	75.9	71.9
Mean monthly sunshine hours	147.9	173.1	234.7	250.8	298.6	337.8	372.2	333.8	263.7	196.1	150.8	138.1	2,897.6
Percentage possible sunshine	51	59	64	65	68	76	84	79	71	59	52	48	65
Average ultraviolet index	1	2	4	5	7	8	8	7	5	3	2	1	4
Source 1: Météo France
Source 2: Weather Atlas (UV), Weather.DirectoryMétéo-France

Climate data for Marseille (Longchamp observatory), elevation: 75 m, 1981–2010 averages, extremes 1868–2003 (Note: Although the values have a record of more than two decades, it can not be used as an overview of the local climate, as it does not reach the minimum period of 30 years required by WMO.)
Month	Jan	Feb	Mar	Apr	May	Jun	Jul	Aug	Sep	Oct	Nov	Dec	Year
Record high °C (°F)	21.2 (70.2)	22.7 (72.9)	26.1 (79.0)	28.6 (83.5)	33.2 (91.8)	36.9 (98.4)	40.6 (105.1)	38.6 (101.5)	33.8 (92.8)	30.9 (87.6)	24.3 (75.7)	23.1 (73.6)	40.6 (105.1)
Mean daily maximum °C (°F)	11.8 (53.2)	12.7 (54.9)	15.9 (60.6)	18.3 (64.9)	22.6 (72.7)	26.2 (79.2)	29.6 (85.3)	29.1 (84.4)	25.2 (77.4)	20.9 (69.6)	15.2 (59.4)	12.5 (54.5)	20.0 (68.0)
Daily mean °C (°F)	8.4 (47.1)	8.9 (48.0)	11.6 (52.9)	13.8 (56.8)	17.9 (64.2)	21.3 (70.3)	24.5 (76.1)	24.1 (75.4)	20.7 (69.3)	16.9 (62.4)	11.8 (53.2)	9.3 (48.7)	15.8 (60.4)
Mean daily minimum °C (°F)	4.9 (40.8)	5.1 (41.2)	7.3 (45.1)	9.3 (48.7)	13.1 (55.6)	16.4 (61.5)	19.4 (66.9)	19.1 (66.4)	16.1 (61.0)	13.0 (55.4)	8.3 (46.9)	6.0 (42.8)	11.5 (52.7)
Record low °C (°F)	−10.5 (13.1)	−14.3 (6.3)	−7.0 (19.4)	−3.0 (26.6)	0.0 (32.0)	4.7 (40.5)	8.5 (47.3)	8.1 (46.6)	0.0 (32.0)	−3.0 (26.6)	−6.9 (19.6)	−11.4 (11.5)	−14.3 (6.3)
Average precipitation mm (inches)	51.1 (2.01)	32.1 (1.26)	30.7 (1.21)	51.1 (2.01)	38.7 (1.52)	23.5 (0.93)	7.6 (0.30)	27.9 (1.10)	71.6 (2.82)	78.6 (3.09)	58.0 (2.28)	52.3 (2.06)	523.2 (20.60)
Average precipitation days (≥ 1.0 mm)	5.5	4.5	4.0	6.1	4.3	2.5	1.3	2.4	4.1	6.1	6.1	5.8	52.6
Source 1: Météo France
Source 2: Infoclimat.fr

Climate data for Marseille-Marignane (Marseille Provence Airport), elevation: 36 m, 1961–1990 normals and extremes
Month	Jan	Feb	Mar	Apr	May	Jun	Jul	Aug	Sep	Oct	Nov	Dec	Year
Record high °C (°F)	19.1 (66.4)	22.1 (71.8)	25.4 (77.7)	26.6 (79.9)	30.1 (86.2)	34.4 (93.9)	39.7 (103.5)	38.6 (101.5)	32.7 (90.9)	30.1 (86.2)	24.4 (75.9)	20.7 (69.3)	39.7 (103.5)
Mean maximum °C (°F)	13.3 (55.9)	16.7 (62.1)	18.0 (64.4)	20.5 (68.9)	24.9 (76.8)	28.4 (83.1)	32.4 (90.3)	30.9 (87.6)	27.4 (81.3)	22.5 (72.5)	17.0 (62.6)	14.7 (58.5)	32.4 (90.3)
Mean daily maximum °C (°F)	10.5 (50.9)	12.3 (54.1)	14.7 (58.5)	17.9 (64.2)	21.8 (71.2)	25.6 (78.1)	28.9 (84.0)	28.5 (83.3)	25.2 (77.4)	20.7 (69.3)	14.6 (58.3)	11.5 (52.7)	19.3 (66.8)
Daily mean °C (°F)	6.6 (43.9)	8.4 (47.1)	10.2 (50.4)	13.3 (55.9)	17.1 (62.8)	20.7 (69.3)	23.6 (74.5)	23.3 (73.9)	20.2 (68.4)	16.2 (61.2)	10.6 (51.1)	7.6 (45.7)	14.8 (58.7)
Mean daily minimum °C (°F)	2.7 (36.9)	4.0 (39.2)	5.7 (42.3)	8.7 (47.7)	12.4 (54.3)	15.7 (60.3)	18.4 (65.1)	18.0 (64.4)	15.4 (59.7)	11.5 (52.7)	6.9 (44.4)	4.0 (39.2)	10.3 (50.5)
Mean minimum °C (°F)	−1.6 (29.1)	−0.6 (30.9)	2.4 (36.3)	6.2 (43.2)	10.1 (50.2)	14.2 (57.6)	16.5 (61.7)	16.4 (61.5)	13.3 (55.9)	6.8 (44.2)	3.8 (38.8)	−0.3 (31.5)	−1.6 (29.1)
Record low °C (°F)	−12.4 (9.7)	−15.0 (5.0)	−7.4 (18.7)	0.3 (32.5)	2.2 (36.0)	6.8 (44.2)	11.7 (53.1)	9.4 (48.9)	6.6 (43.9)	0.4 (32.7)	−5.0 (23.0)	−12.3 (9.9)	−15.0 (5.0)
Average precipitation mm (inches)	42.4 (1.67)	47.7 (1.88)	42.7 (1.68)	37.0 (1.46)	38.2 (1.50)	23.3 (0.92)	6.0 (0.24)	25.7 (1.01)	37.8 (1.49)	45.0 (1.77)	48.2 (1.90)	56.3 (2.22)	450.3 (17.74)
Average precipitation days (≥ 1.0 mm)	6.5	6.0	5.5	5.3	4.9	3.5	1.6	3.0	3.6	5.8	5.1	6.0	56.8
Average snowy days	0.8	0.4	0.1	0.0	0.0	0.0	0.0	0.0	0.0	0.0	0.2	0.7	2.2
Average relative humidity (%)	75	72	67	65	64	63	59	62	69	74	75	77	69
Mean monthly sunshine hours	150.0	155.5	215.1	244.8	292.5	326.2	366.4	327.4	254.3	204.5	155.5	143.3	2,835.5
Percentage possible sunshine	53	53	59	62	65	72	79	77	68	61	54	52	63
Source 1: NOAA
Source 2: Infoclimat.fr (humidity)

== History ==
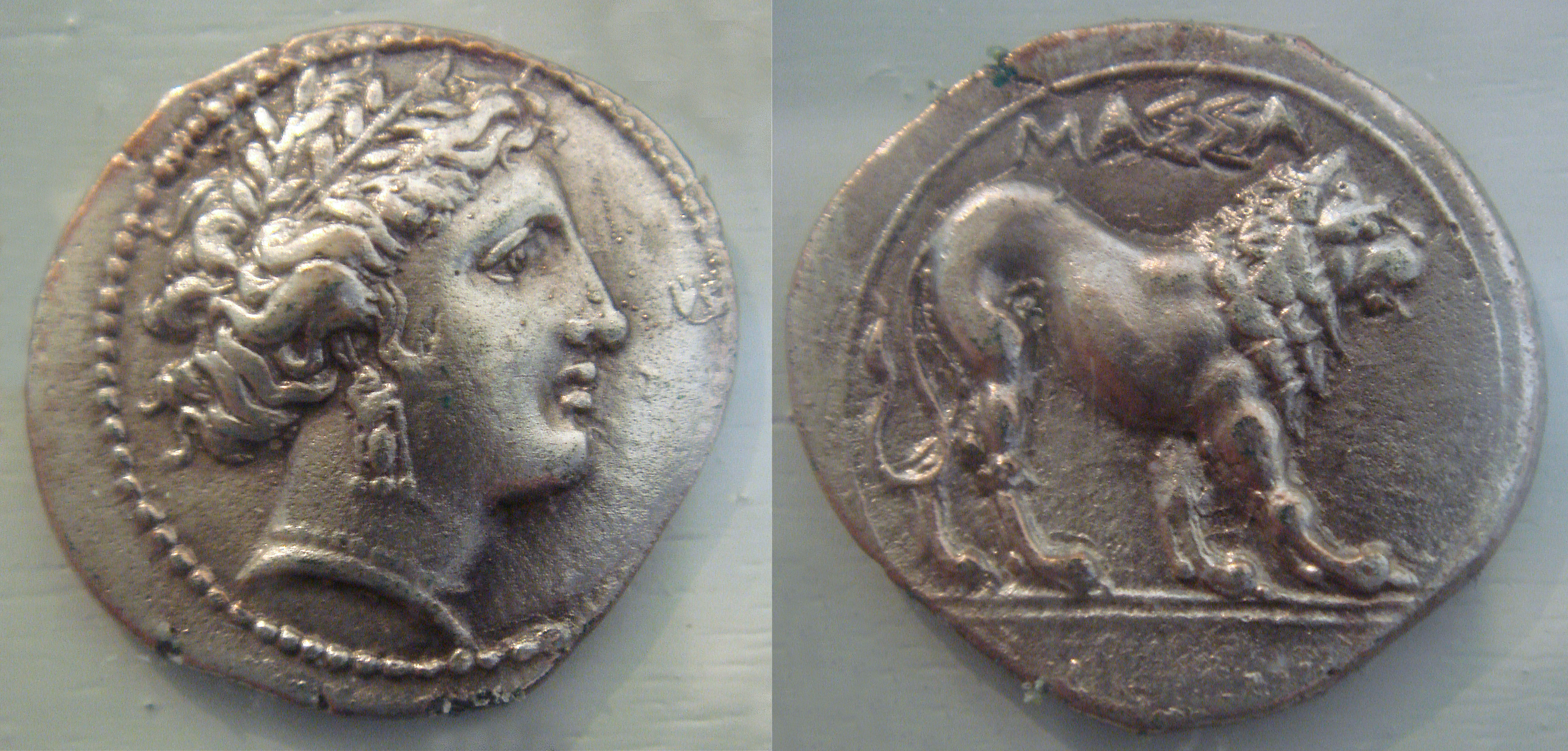
A silver drachma inscribed with MASSA[LIA] (ΜΑΣΣΑ[ΛΙΑ]), dated 375–200 BC, during the Hellenistic period of Marseille, bearing the head of the Greek goddess Artemis on the obverse and a lion on the reverse

Marseille was founded as the Greek colony of Massalia c. 600 BC, and was populated by Greek settlers from Phocaea (modern Foça, Turkey). It became the preeminent Greek polis in the Hellenized region of southern Gaul. The city-state sided with the Roman Republic against Carthage during the Second Punic War (218–201 BC), retaining its independence and commercial empire throughout the western Mediterranean even as Rome expanded its empire into Western Europe and North Africa. However, the city lost its independence following the Roman Siege of Massilia in 49 BC, during Caesar's Civil War, in which Massalia sided with the exiled faction at war with Julius Caesar. Afterward, the Gallo-Roman culture was initiated.

The city maintained its position as a premier maritime trading hub even after its capture by the Visigoths in the fifth century AD, although the city went into decline following the sack of AD 739 by the forces of Charles Martel against the Umayyad Caliphate. It became part of the County of Provence during the tenth century, although its renewed prosperity was curtailed by the Black Death of the 14th century and a sack of the city by the Crown of Aragon in 1423. The city's fortunes rebounded with the ambitious building projects of René of Anjou, Count of Provence, who strengthened the city's fortifications during the mid-15th century. During the 16th century, the city hosted a naval fleet with the combined forces of the Franco-Ottoman alliance, which threatened the ports and navies of the Genoese Republic.

Marseille lost a significant portion of its population during the Great Plague of Marseille in 1720, but the population had recovered by mid-century. In 1792, the city became a focal point of the French Revolution, and though France's national anthem was born in Strasbourg, it was first sung in Paris by volunteers from Marseille, hence the name the crowd gave it: La Marseillaise. The Industrial Revolution and establishment of the second French colonial empire during the 19th century allowed for the further expansion of the city, although it was occupied by the German Wehrmacht in November 1942 and subsequently heavily damaged during World War II. The city has since become a major center for immigrant communities from former French colonies in Africa, such as French Algeria.

== Economy ==
Marseille is a major hub of trade and industry in France, supported by a well-developed transportation network that includes roads, a seaport, and an airport. Marseille Provence Airport is the fourth largest in France. In May 2005, the French financial magazine L'Expansion named Marseille the most dynamic of France's large cities, citing figures showing that 7,200 companies had been created in the city since 2000. As of 2019, the Marseille metropolitan area had a GDP amounting to US$81.4 billion, (Note: Constant PPP US dollars, base year 2015.) or US$43,430 per capita (purchasing power parity).

=== Port ===
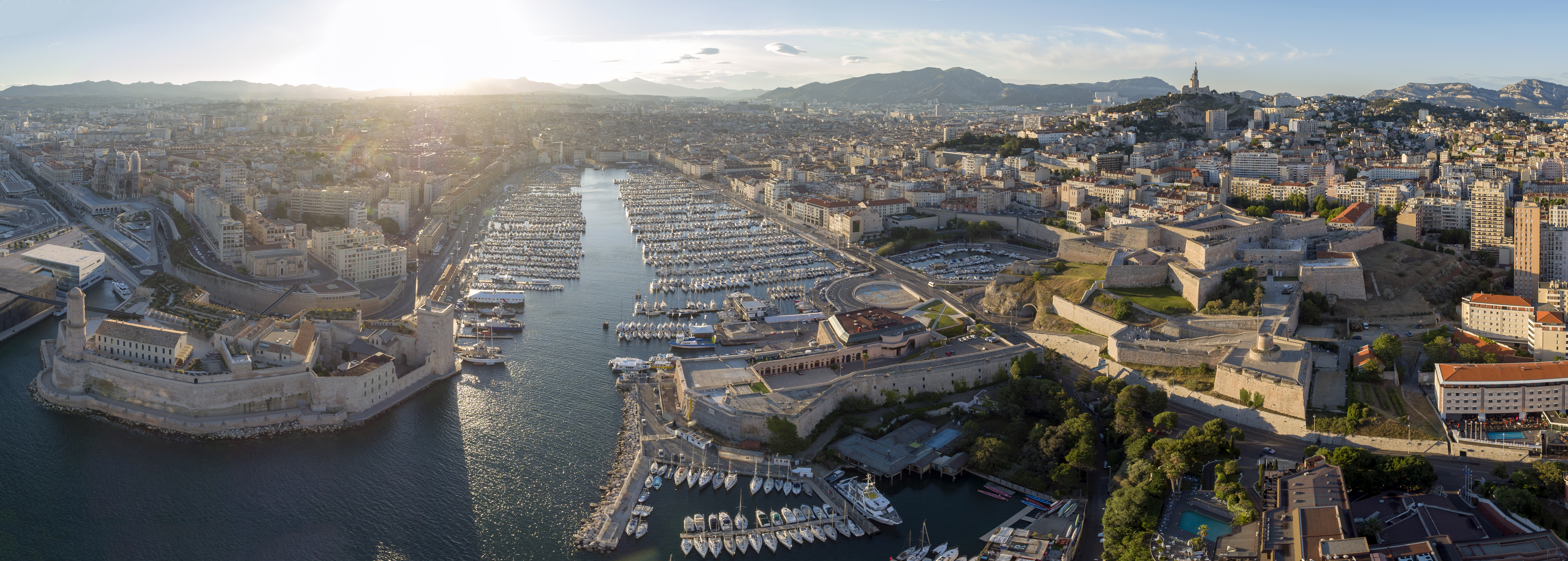
The entrance to the Old Port, flanked by Fort Saint-Jean and Fort Saint-Nicolas

Historically, the economy of Marseille was dominated by its role as a port of the French Empire, linking the North African colonies of Algeria, Morocco and Tunisia with Metropolitan France. The Old Port was replaced as the main port for trade by the Port de la Joliette (now part of Marseille-Fos Port) during the Second Empire and now contains restaurants, offices, bars and hotels and functions mostly as a private marina. The majority of the port and docks, which experienced decline in the 1970s after the oil crisis, have been recently redeveloped with funds from the European Union. Fishing remains important in Marseille and the food economy of Marseille is fed by the local catch; a daily fish market is still held on the Quai des Belges of the Old Port.

The economy of Marseille and its region is still linked to its commercial port, the first French port and the fifth European port by cargo tonnage, which lies north of the Old Port and eastern in Fos-sur-Mer. Some 45,000 jobs are linked to the port activities and it represents €4 billion of added value to the regional economy. 100 million tons of freight pass annually through the port, 60% of which is petroleum, making it number one in France and the Mediterranean and number three in Europe. However, in the early 2000s, the growth in container traffic was being stifled by the constant strikes and social upheaval. The port is among the 20th firsts in Europe for container traffic with 1,062,408 TEU and new infrastructure has already raised the capacity to 2 million TEU. Marseille is connected with the Rhône via a canal and thus has access to the extensive waterway network of France. Petroleum is shipped northward to the Paris basin by pipeline. The city also serves as France's leading centre of oil refining.

=== Companies, services and high technologies ===
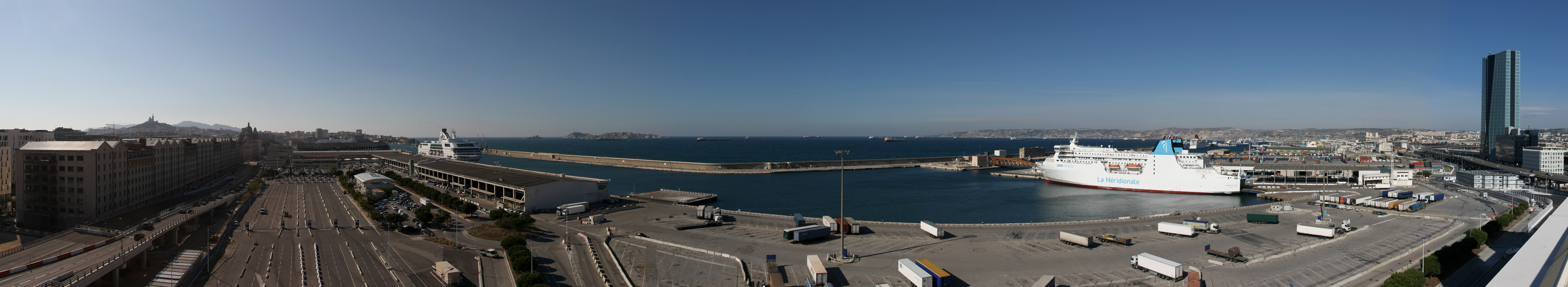
From left to right: La Joliette neighbourhood (old docks), ferry ship docks, new port, Euroméditerranée business district (CMA CGM Tower) and surrounding areas

In recent years, the city has also experienced a large growth in service sector employment and a switch from light manufacturing to a cultural, high-tech economy. The Marseille region is home to thousands of companies, 90% of which are small and medium enterprises with less than 500 employees. Among the most famous are CMA CGM, container-shipping giant; Compagnie maritime d'expertises (Comex), a leader in sub-sea engineering and hydraulic systems; Airbus Helicopters, an Airbus division; Azur Promotel, an active real estate development company; La Provence, the local daily newspaper; RTM, Marseille's public transport company; and Société Nationale Maritime Corse Méditerranée (SNCM), a major provider of passenger, vehicle and freight transportation in the Western Mediterranean. The Euroméditerranée urban development project has significantly expanded the city's office stock, making Marseille home to one of the largest business districts in France.

Marseille is the home of three main technopoles: Château-Gombert (technological innovations), Luminy (biotechnology) and La Belle de Mai (17,000 sq.m. of offices dedicated to multimedia activities).

=== Tourism and attractions ===
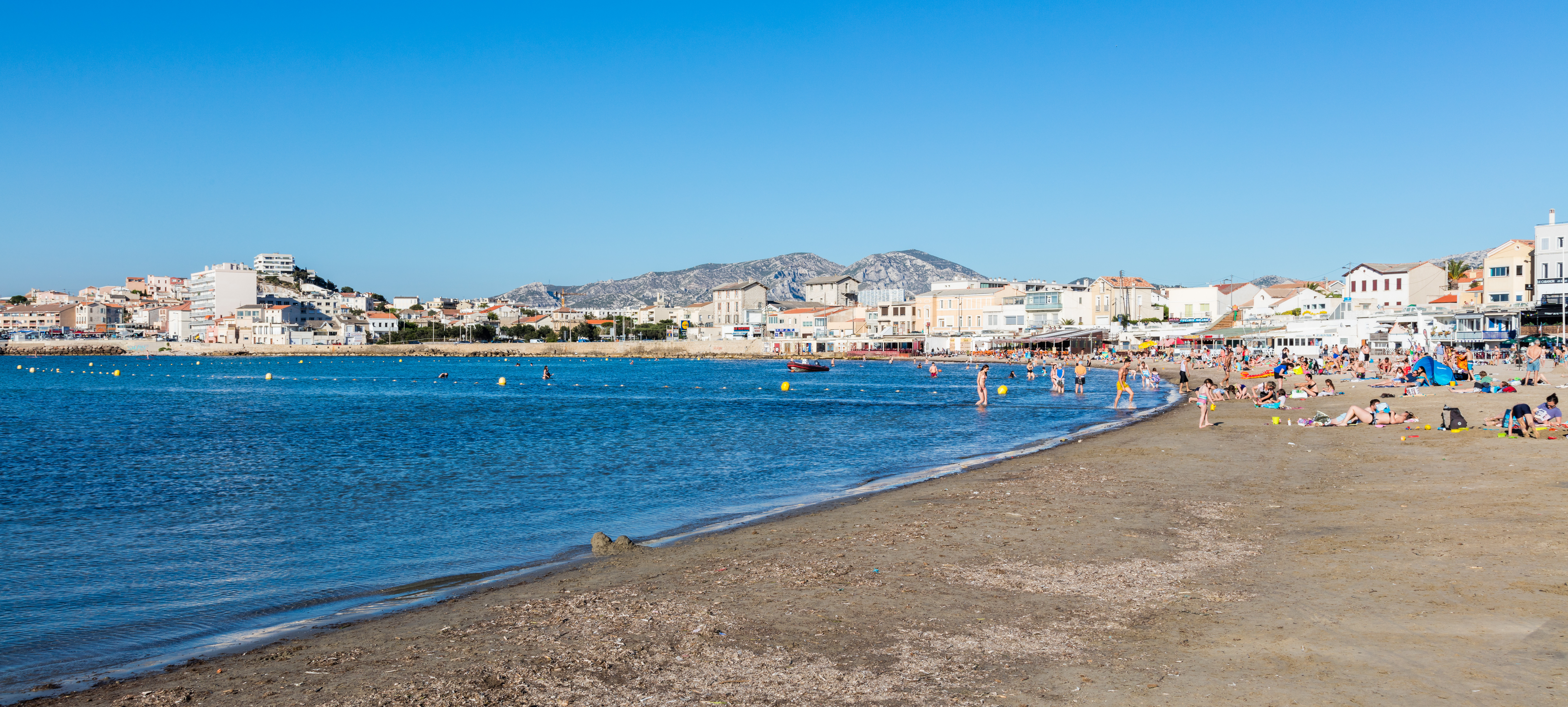
Pointe Rouge Beach

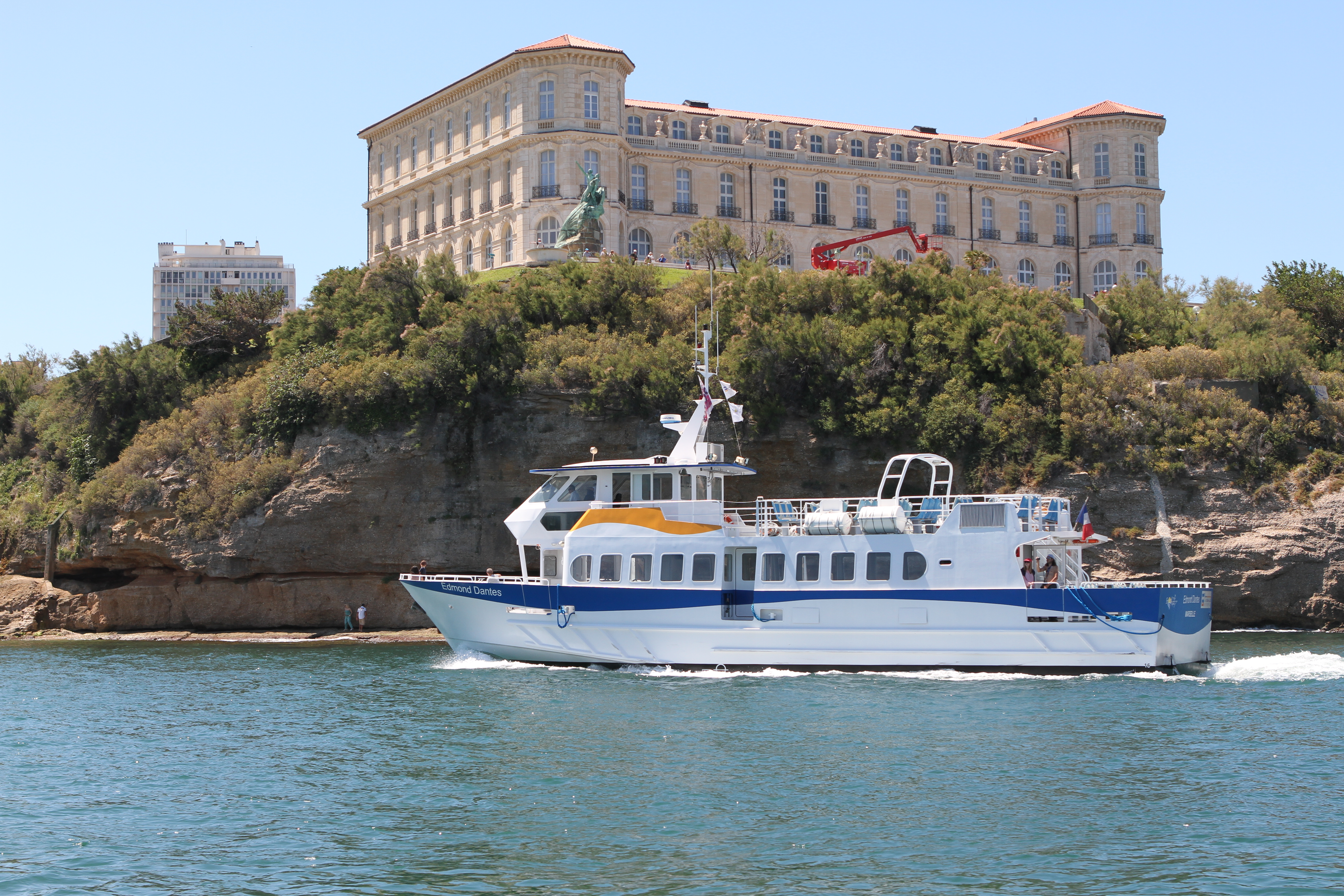
Palais du Pharo

The port is also an important arrival base for millions of people each year, with 2.4 million including 890,100 from cruise ships. With its beaches, history, architecture and culture (24 museums and 42 theatres), Marseille is one of the most visited cities in France, with 4.1 million visitors in 2012.

They take place in three main sites, the Palais du Pharo, Palais des Congrès et des Expositions (Parc Chanot) and World Trade Center. In 2012 Marseille hosted the World Water Forum. Several urban projects have been developed to make Marseille attractive. Thus new parks, museums, public spaces and real estate projects aim to improve the city's quality of life (Parc du 26e Centenaire, Old Port of Marseille, numerous places in Euroméditerranée) to attract firms and people. Marseille municipality acts to develop Marseille as a regional nexus for entertainment in the south of France with high concentration of museums, cinemas, theatres, clubs, bars, restaurants, fashion shops, hotels, and art galleries.

=== Employment ===
The unemployment rate in Marseille fell from 20% in 1995 to 14% in 2004. In 2022, the unemployment rate in Marseille was 13.1%, according to data from the French National Institute of Statistics and Economic Studies (INSEE). However, Marseille's unemployment rate remains higher than the national average. In some parts of Marseille, youth unemployment is reported to be as high as 40%.

== Administration ==
The sectors and arrondissements of Marseille

Political majority in each sector since 2014

The city of Marseille is divided into 16 municipal arrondissements, which are themselves informally divided into 111 neighbourhoods (French: quartiers). The arrondissements are regrouped in pairs, into 8 sectors, each with a mayor and council (like the arrondissements in Paris and Lyon). Municipal elections are held every six years and are carried out by sector. There are 303 councilmembers in total, two-thirds sitting in the sector councils and one third in the city council.

The 9th arrondissement of Marseille is the largest in terms of area because it comprises parts of Calanques National Park. With a population of 89,316 (2007), the 13th arrondissement of Marseille is the most populous one.

From 1950 to the mid-1990s, Marseille was a Socialist (PS) and Communist (PCF) stronghold. Gaston Defferre (PS) was consecutively reelected six times as Mayor of Marseille from 1953 until his death in 1986. He was succeeded by Robert Vigouroux of the European Democratic and Social Rally (RDSE). Jean-Claude Gaudin of the conservative UMP was elected Mayor of Marseille in 1995. Gaudin was reelected in 2001, 2008 and 2014.

In recent years, the Communist Party has lost most of its strength in the northern boroughs of the city, whereas the National Front has received significant support. At the last municipal election in 2014, Marseille was divided between the northern arrondissements dominated by the left (PS) and far-right (FN) and the southern part of town dominated by the conservative (UMP). Marseille is also divided in twelve cantons, each of them sending two members to the Departmental Council of the Bouches-du-Rhône department.

=== Mayors of Marseille since the beginning of the 20th century ===
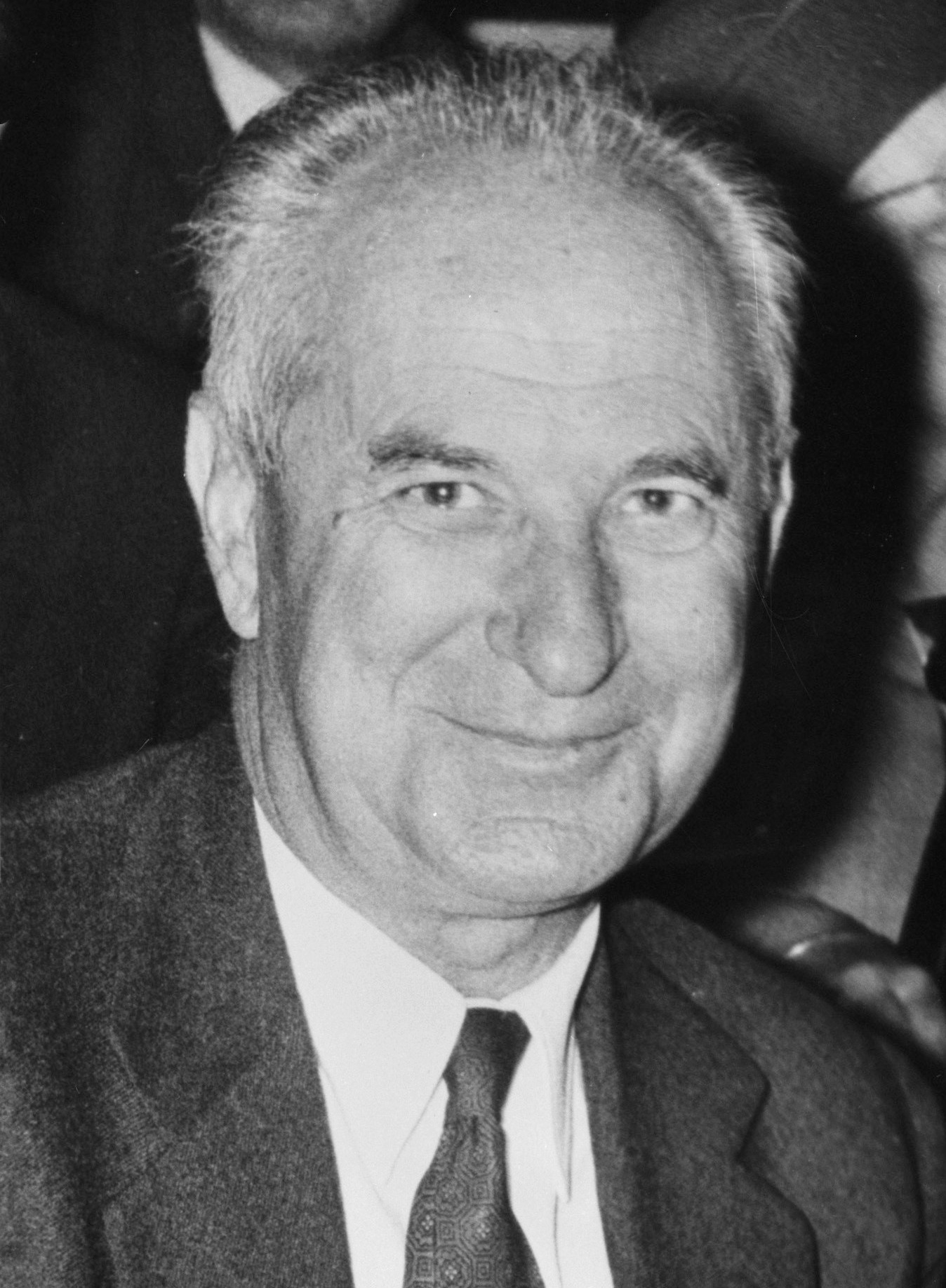
Gaston Defferre served as Mayor of Marseille from 1953 to 1986.

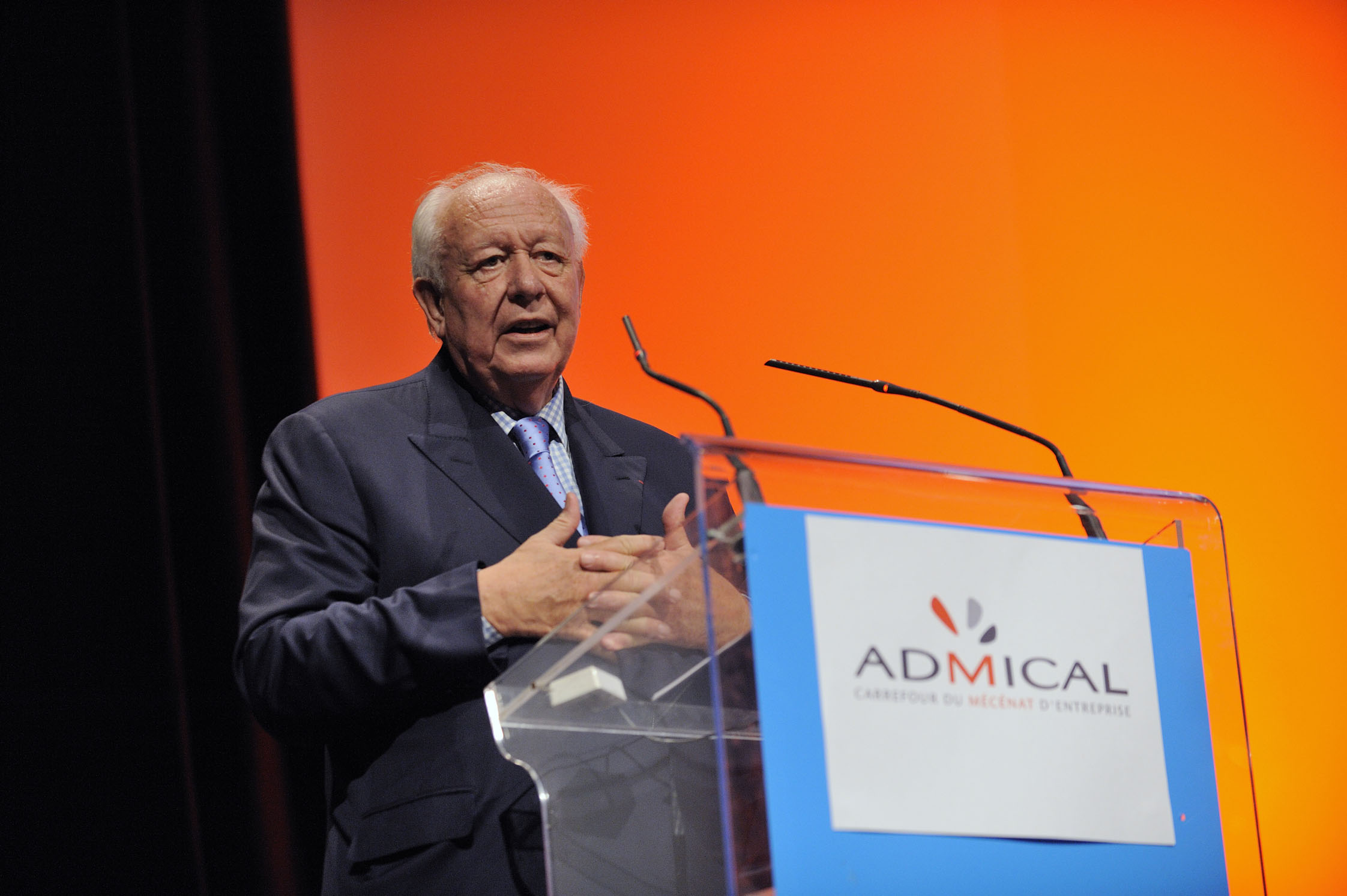
Jean-Claude Gaudin served as Mayor of Marseille from 1995 to 2020.

Mayor	Term start	Term end	Party
Siméon Flaissières	1895	1902	POF
Albin Curet (acting)	1902	1902	Independent
Jean-Baptiste-Amable Chanot	1902	1908	FR
Emmanuel Allard	1908	1910	FR
Clément Lévy (acting)	1910	1910	Independent
Bernard Cadenat	1910	1912	SFIO
Jean-Baptiste-Amable Chanot	1912	1914	FR
Eugène Pierre	1914	1919	Independent
Siméon Flaissières	1919	1931	SFIO
Simon Sabiani	1931	1931	Independent
Georges Ribot	1931	1935	RAD
Henri Tasso	1935	1939	SFIO
Nominated administrators	1939	1946	Independent
Jean Cristofol	1946	1947	PCF
Michel Carlini	1947	1953	RPF
Gaston Defferre	1953	1986	SFIO, PS
Jean-Victor Cordonnier (acting)	1986	1986	PS
Robert Vigouroux	1986	1995	PS, DVG
Jean-Claude Gaudin	1995	2020	UDF-PR, DL, UMP, LR
Michèle Rubirola	2020	2020	EELV
Benoît Payan	2020	Incumbent	PS

== Demographics ==
Population of the commune of Marseille (241 km^{2})
(within 2025 borders)

Year	Pop.	±% p.a.
1800	96,413	—
1806	99,169	+0.47%
1821	109,483	+0.66%
1831	145,115	+2.86%
1836	146,239	+0.15%
1841	154,035	+1.04%
1846	183,186	+3.47%
1851	195,258	+1.28%
1856	233,817	+3.86%
1861	260,910	+2.19%
1866	300,131	+2.84%
1872	312,864	+0.69%
1876	318,868	+0.42%
1881	360,099	+2.38%
1886	376,143	+0.96%
1891	403,749	+1.47%
1896	442,239	+1.85%
1901	491,161	+2.13%

Year	Pop.	±% p.a.
1906	517,498	+1.06%
1911	550,619	+1.25%
1921	586,341	+0.63%
1926	600,196	+0.47%
1931	609,881	+0.32%
1936	620,232	+0.34%
1946	636,264	+0.26%
1954	661,407	+0.48%
1962	778,071	+2.10%
1968	889,029	+2.25%
1975	908,600	+0.31%
1982	874,436	−0.54%
1990	800,550	−1.10%
1999	798,430	−0.03%
2007	852,395	+0.84%
2012	852,516	+0.00%
2017	863,310	+0.25%
2023	886,040	+0.43%

All figures come from population censuses. Figures from 1926 to 1936 (incl.) are the redressed figures calculated by INSEE to correct the overestimated population of Marseille published by the municipal authorities at the time (10,000s of false residents had been added by the municipal authorities to artificially inflate the population figures and remain the 2nd largest city of France ahead of Lyon).
Source: EHESS and INSEE

Population of the Marseille metropolitan area (3,972 km^{2})
(92 communes, within 2020 borders)

Year	Pop.	±% p.a.
1800	249,235	—
1806	256,191	+0.46%
1821	274,426	+0.46%
1831	315,951	+1.42%
1836	319,252	+0.20%
1841	328,244	+0.56%
1846	360,774	+1.88%
1851	373,521	+0.70%
1856	413,542	+2.16%
1861	446,330	+1.52%
1866	486,571	+1.74%
1872	496,241	+0.33%
1876	500,458	+0.19%
1881	532,643	+1.22%
1886	545,220	+0.52%
1891	569,762	+0.91%
1896	608,754	+1.34%
1901	660,766	+1.66%

Year	Pop.	±% p.a.
1906	688,924	+0.85%
1911	723,847	+0.99%
1921	759,119	+0.48%
1926	791,464	+0.84%
1931	818,346	+0.67%
1936	839,596	+0.51%
1946	870,126	+0.36%
1954	936,888	+0.91%
1962	1,120,791	+2.32%
1968	1,324,444	+2.82%
1975	1,470,128	+1.51%
1982	1,551,793	+0.77%
1990	1,594,849	+0.34%
1999	1,675,790	+0.55%
2007	1,795,382	+0.89%
2012	1,815,196	+0.22%
2017	1,851,736	+0.40%
2023	1,917,728	+0.59%

All figures come from population censuses. Figures from 1926 to 1936 (incl.) use for the commune of Marseille the redressed figures calculated by INSEE to correct the overestimated population published by the municipal authorities at the time (10,000s of false residents had been added by the municipal authorities to artificially inflate the population figures and remain the 2nd largest city of France ahead of Lyon).
Source: EHESS and INSEE

=== Immigration ===
Largest groups of immigrants (Note: An immigrant is a person born in a foreign country not having French citizenship at birth. Note that an immigrant may have acquired French citizenship since moving to France, but is still considered an immigrant in French statistics. On the other hand, persons born in France with foreign citizenship (the children of immigrants) are not listed as immigrants.) and natives of Overseas France in the Marseille metropolitan area
Country/territory of birth	Population (2019)
Algeria	59,927
Tunisia	17,340
Morocco	16,704
Italy	11,740
Comoros	10,457
Portugal	7,708
Spain	7,384
Turkey	6,863
Romania	4,514
Réunion	3,841
Senegal	3,173
Madagascar	2,885
Vietnam	2,754
Belgium	2,594
Germany	2,444
Mayotte	2,304
Martinique	2,168
Russia	2,078
United Kingdom	1,767
China (Note: Not including Hong Kong and Macau)	1,732
Lebanon	1,614

Because of its pre-eminence as a Mediterranean port, Marseille has always been one of the main gateways into France. This has attracted many immigrants and made Marseille a cosmopolitan melting pot. By the end of the 18th century about half the population originated from elsewhere in Provence mostly and also from southern France.

Economic conditions and political unrest in Europe and the rest of the world brought several other waves of immigrants during the 20th century: Greeks and Italians started arriving at the end of the 19th century and in the first half of the 20th century, up to 40% of the city's population was of Italian origin; Russians in 1917; Armenians in 1915 and 1923; Vietnamese in the 1920s, 1954 and after 1975; Corsicans during the 1920s and 1930s; Spanish after 1936; Maghrebis (both Arab and Berber) in the inter-war period; Sub-Saharan Africans after 1945; Maghrebi Jews in the 1950s and 1960s; the Pieds-Noirs from the former French Algeria in 1962; and then from Comoros.

At the 2019 census, 81.4% of the inhabitants of the Marseille metropolitan area were natives of Metropolitan France, 0.6% were born in Overseas France, and 18.0% were born in foreign countries (two-fifth of whom French citizens from birth, in particular Pieds-Noirs from Algeria arrived in Metropolitan France after the independence of Algeria in 1962). A quarter of the immigrants living in the Marseille metropolitan area were born in Europe (half of them in Italy, Portugal, and Spain), 46% were born in the Maghreb (almost two-third of them in Algeria), 14% in the rest of Africa (almost half of them in the Indian Ocean islands of Comoros, Madagascar, and Mauritius, not counting those born in Réunion and Mayotte who are not legally immigrants), and 15.0% in the rest of the world (not counting those born in the French overseas departments of the Americas and in the French territories of the South Pacific, who are not legally immigrants).

In 2002, about one third of the population of Marseille can trace their roots back to Italy. Marseille also has the second-largest Corsican and Armenian populations of France. Other significant communities include Maghrebis, Turks, Comorians, Chinese, and Vietnamese.

The largest immigrant communities (including descendants) in 2002 were Italians (290,000 Italians, or 33%), then Muslims - mainly Maghrebis (200,000 Muslims, or 23%), then Corsicans (100,000 Corsicans, or 11.5%), then Armenians (80,000 Armenians, or 9%).

In 1999, in several arrondissements, about 40% of the young people under 18 were of Maghrebi origin (at least one immigrant parent).

Since 2013 a significant number of Central- and Eastern European immigrants have settled in Marseille, attracted by better job opportunities and the good climate of this Mediterranean city.

Place of birth of residents of the Marseille metropolitan area at the 2019 census
Born in Metropolitan France	Born in Overseas France	Born in foreign countries with French citizenship at birth^{[a]}	Immigrants^{[b]}		
81.4%	0.6%	7.1%	10.9%		
81.4%	0.6%	7.1%	from Europe	from the Maghreb^{[c]}	from Africa (excl. Maghreb)
81.4%	0.6%	7.1%	2.7%	5.0%	1.5%
81.4%	0.6%	7.1%	from Turkey	from Asia (excl. Turkey)	from the Americas & Oceania
81.4%	0.6%	7.1%	0.4%	1.0%	0.3%
^aPersons born abroad of French parents, such as Pieds-Noirs and children of French expatriates.^bAn immigrant is by French definition a person born in a foreign country and who did not have French citizenship at birth. Note that an immigrant may have acquired French citizenship since moving to France, but is still listed as an immigrant in French statistics. On the other hand, persons born in France with foreign citizenship (the children of immigrants) are not listed as immigrants.^cMorocco, Tunisia, Algeria
Source: INSEE

Place of birth of residents of the city proper of Marseille at the 1999 and 2019 censuses
Year	Born in Metropolitan France	Born in Overseas France	Born in foreign countries with French citizenship at birth^{[a]}	Immigrants^{[b]}		
2019	75.9%	0.8%	8.2%	15.1%		
2019	75.9%	0.8%	8.2%	from Europe	from the Maghreb^{[c]}	from Africa (excl. Maghreb)
2019	75.9%	0.8%	8.2%	2.6%	7.5%	2.7%
2019	75.9%	0.8%	8.2%	from Turkey	from Asia (excl. Turkey)	from the Americas & Oceania
2019	75.9%	0.8%	8.2%	0.6%	1.4%	0.3%
1999	78.9%	0.9%	8.8%	11.4%		
1999	78.9%	0.9%	8.8%	from EU-15		non-EU-15
1999	78.9%	0.9%	8.8%	2.1%		9.3%
^aPersons born abroad of French parents, such as Pieds-Noirs and children of French expatriates.^bAn immigrant is by French definition a person born in a foreign country and who did not have French citizenship at birth. Note that an immigrant may have acquired French citizenship since moving to France, but is still listed as an immigrant in French statistics. On the other hand, persons born in France with foreign citizenship (the children of immigrants) are not listed as immigrants.^cMorocco, Tunisia, Algeria
Source: INSEE

=== Crime ===
Since the early 2020s, the city has struggled with a notable rise in narcotrafficking and other issues related to organized criminal networks, with 2023 being described as the city's "deadliest year." In November 2025, France's Justice Minister, Gérald Darmanin, described the threat posed by these groups as "at least equivalent to terrorism." According to The Global Initiative Against Transnational Organized Crime, Marseille "has become a hotspot of violence," witnessing "more than 300 drug-related killings in the last decade, with a 50 per cent increase between 2022 and 2023 alone."

== Culture ==
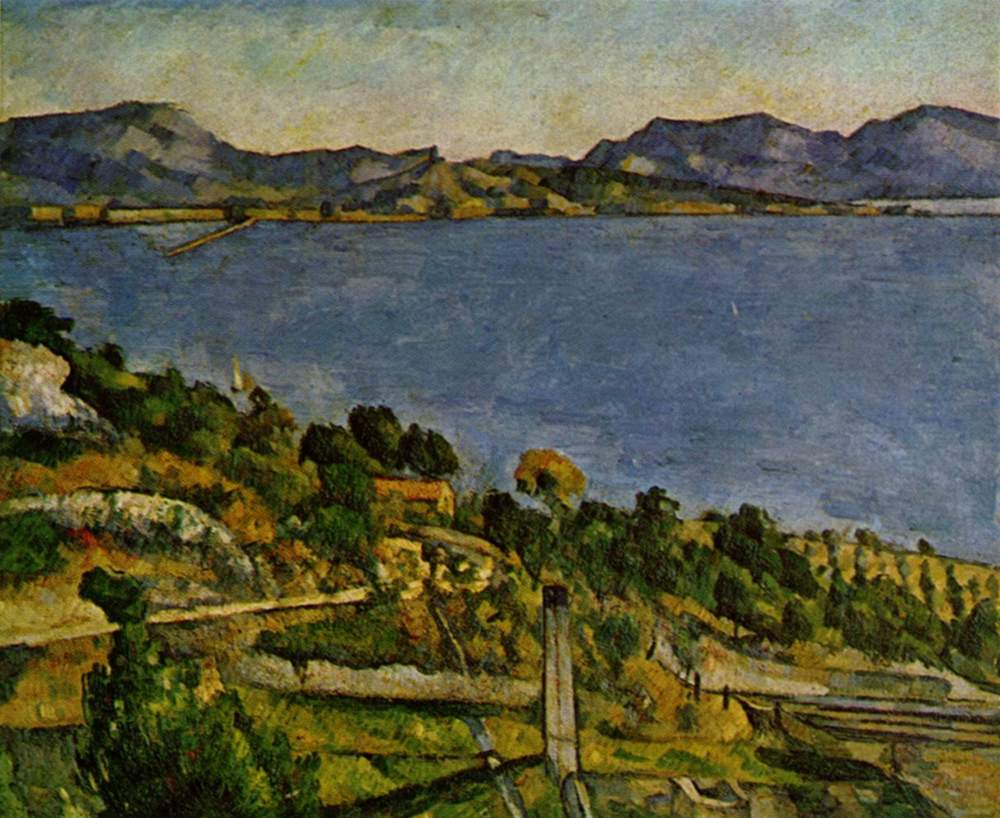
Paul Cézanne's The Bay of Marseille, Seen from L'Estaque

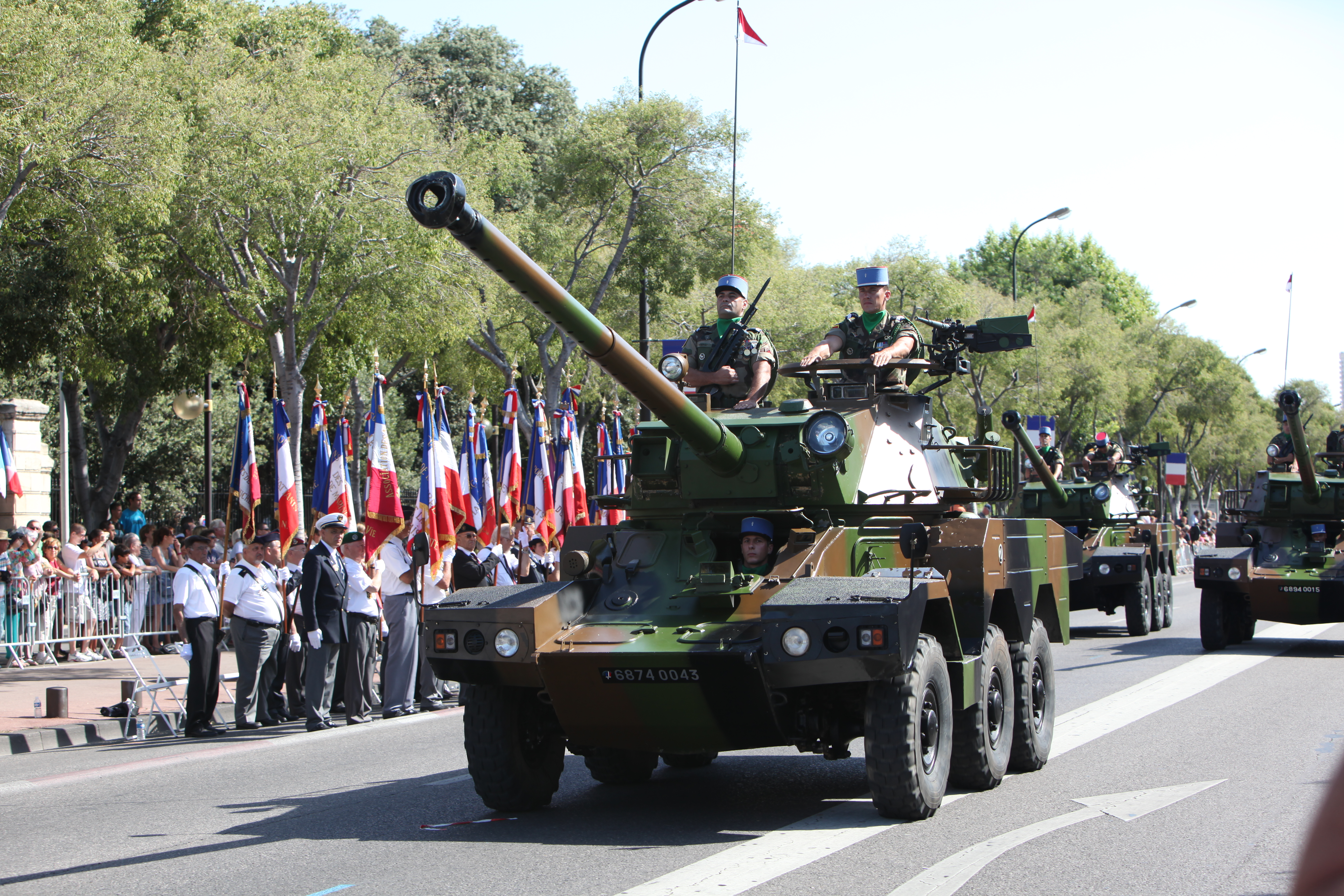
Bastille Day military parade in Marseille, 2012

Marseille is a city that has its own unique culture. Today it is a regional centre for culture and entertainment, with an opera house, historical and maritime museums, five art galleries and numerous cinemas, clubs, bars and restaurants.

Marseille has a large number of theatres, including La Criée, Le Gymnase and the Théâtre Toursky. There is also an extensive arts centre in La Friche, a former match factory behind the Saint-Charles station. The Alcazar, until the 1960s a well known music hall and variety theatre, has recently been completely remodelled behind its original façade and now houses the central municipal library. Other music venues in Marseille include Le Silo (also a theatre) and GRIM.

Marseille has also been important in the arts. It has been the birthplace and home of many French writers and poets, including Victor Gélu, Valère Bernard, Pierre Bertas, Edmond Rostand and André Roussin. The small port of l'Estaque on the far end of the Bay of Marseille became a favourite haunt for artists, including Auguste Renoir, Paul Cézanne (who frequently visited from his home in Aix), Georges Braque and Raoul Dufy.

=== Multi-cultural influences ===
Rich and poor neighborhoods exist side by side. Although the city has crime, Marseille has a large degree of multicultural tolerance. Urban geographers say the city's geography, being surrounded by mountains, helps explain why Marseille does not have the same problems as Paris. In Paris, ethnic areas are segregated and concentrated in the periphery of the city. Residents of Marseille are of diverse origins, yet appear to share a similar particular identity. An example is how Marseille responded in 2005, when ethnic populations living in other French cities' suburbs rioted, but Marseille remained relatively calm.

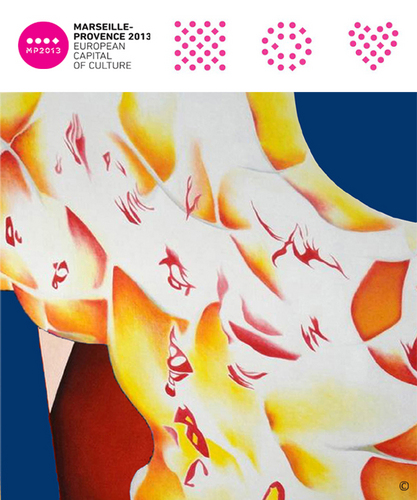
Poster of Marseille-Provence 2013 designed by Guillaume Bottazzi

Marseille served as the European Capital of Culture for 2013 along with Košice. It was chosen to give a 'human face' to the European Union to celebrate cultural diversity and to increase understanding between Europeans. One of the intentions of highlighting culture is to help reposition Marseille internationally, stimulate the economy, and help to build better interconnection between groups. Marseille-Provence 2013 (MP2013) featured more than 900 cultural events held throughout Marseille and the surrounding communities. These cultural events generated more than 11 million visits. The European Capital of Culture was also the occasion to unveil more than 600 million euros in new cultural infrastructure in Marseille and its environs, including the MuCEM designed by Rudy Ricciotti.

Early on, immigrants came to Marseille locally from the surrounding Provence region. By the 1890s immigrants came from other regions of France as well as Italy. Marseille became one of Europe's busiest ports by 1900. Marseille has served as a major port where immigrants from around the Mediterranean arrive. Marseille continued to be multicultural. Armenians from the Ottoman Empire began arriving in 1913. In the 1930s, Italians settled in Marseille. After World War II, a wave of Jewish immigrants from North Africa arrived. In 1962, a number of French colonies gained their independence, and the French citizens from Algeria, Morocco, and Tunisia arrived in Marseille. The city had an economic downturn and lost many jobs. Those who could afford to move left and the poorest remained. For a while, the mafia appeared to run the city, and for a period of time the communist party was prominent.

Multi-cultural Marseille can be observed by a visitor at the market at Noailles, also called Marché des Capucins, in old town near the Old Port. There, Lebanese bakeries, an African spice market, Chinese and Vietnamese groceries, fresh vegetables and fruit, shops selling couscous, shops selling Caribbean food are side by side with stalls selling shoes and clothing from around the Mediterranean. Nearby, people sell fresh fish and men from Tunisia drink tea.

Although most Armenians arrived after the Armenian Genocide, Armenians had a long presence even before the 20th and late 19th centuries. Armenians, having an extensive trade network worldwide, massively traded with Marseille and its port. Most notably, during the 16th century, and after the Armenians gained a monopoly over Iranian silk, which was granted to them by Shah Abbas of Iran, the trade flow of Armenians of Marseille increased tremendously. Merchants of Armenian origin received trade privileges in France by Armand Jean du Plessis de Richelieu (1585–1642) and later on Jean-Baptiste Colbert (1619–1683) Marseille a free port in 1669. One notable Armenian-Iranian merchant gained a patent from Louis XIV (1638–1715) over Iranian silk. Armenians also became successful money-lenders and bankers in the city. Due to these policies and the multiculturalism of the city of Marseille, Armenians became very wealthy, and the legacy of the Armenians in the city still lives on.

Multiculturalism in Marseille is not without its challenges; the city still does not have an official mosque, despite some estimates for the Muslim population in Marseille being as high as 40%. In addition, the city is still heavily segregated, between the poor, majority-Muslim north, and the richer, less Muslim south. And, "according to the Organisation for Economic Co-operation and Development thinktank, Marseille is the most economically divided city in Europe."

Languages spoken in Marseille include French, Arabic, Occitan, and Marseillais.

=== Tarot de Marseille ===
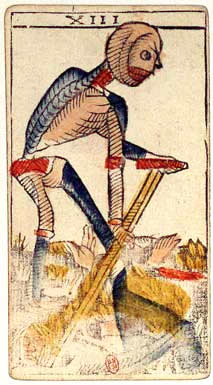
Marseille tarot card

The most commonly used tarot deck takes its name from the city; it has been called the Tarot de Marseille since the 1930s—a name coined for commercial use by the French cardmaker and cartomancer Paul Marteau, owner of B–P Grimaud. Previously this deck was called Tarot italien (Italian Tarot) and even earlier it was simply called Tarot. Before being de Marseille, it was used to play the local variant of tarocchi before it became used in cartomancy at the end of the 18th century, following the trend set by Antoine Court de Gébelin. The name Tarot de Marseille (Marteau used the name ancien Tarot de Marseille) was used by contrast to other types of Tarots such as Tarot de Besançon; those names were simply associated with cities where there were many cardmakers in the 18th century (previously several cities in France were involved in cardmaking).

Another local tradition is the making of santons, small hand-crafted figurines for the traditional Provençal Christmas creche. Since 1803, starting on the last Sunday of November, there has been a Santon Fair in Marseille; it is currently held in the Cours d'Estienne d'Orves, a large square off the Vieux-Port.

=== Opera ===
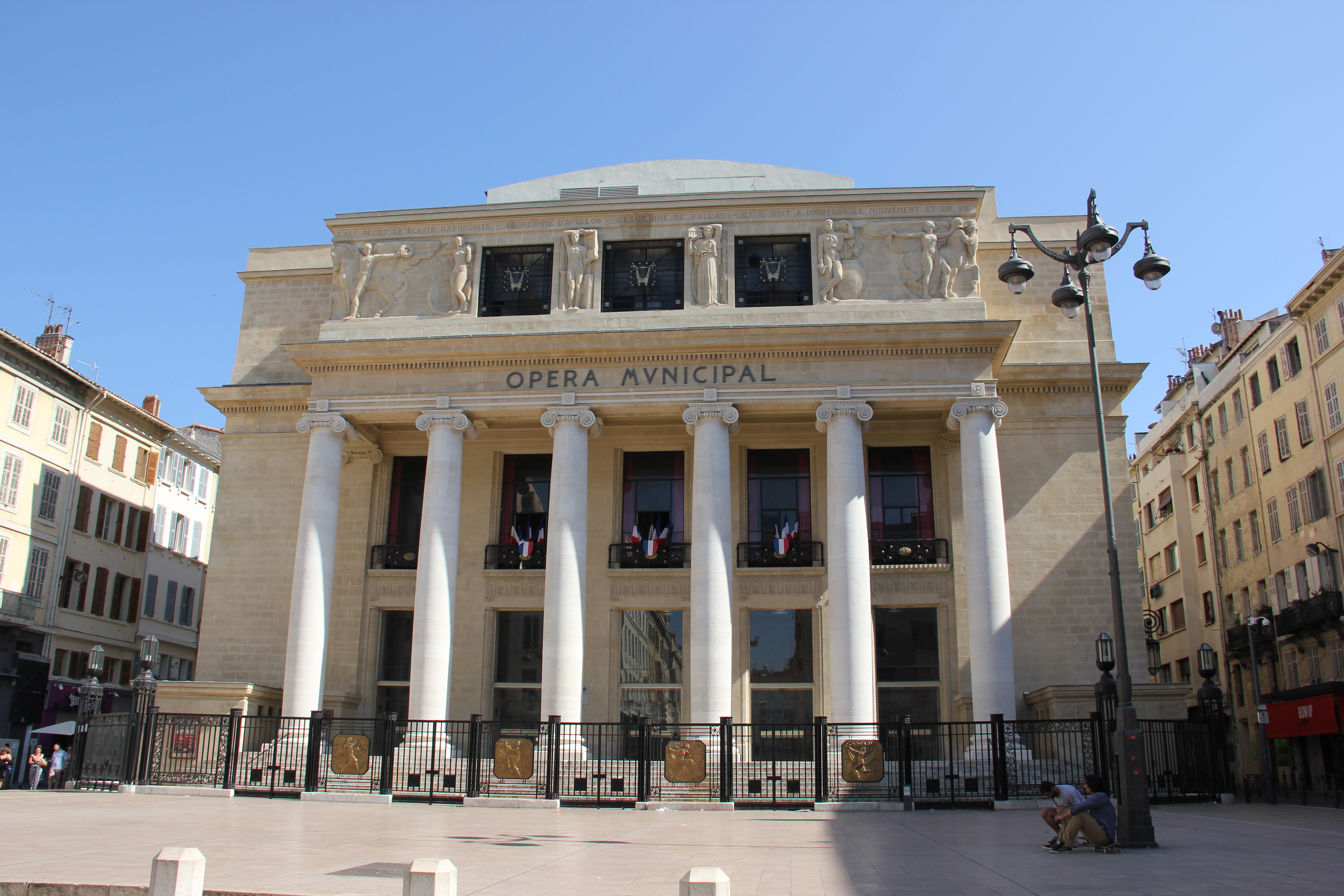
The Opéra de Marseille

Marseille's main cultural attraction was, since its creation at the end of the 18th century and until the late 1970s, the Opéra. Located near the Old Port and the Canebière, at the very heart of the city, its architectural style was comparable to the classical trend found in other opera houses built at the same time in Lyon and Bordeaux. In 1919, a fire almost completely destroyed the house, leaving only the stone colonnade and peristyle from the original façade. The classical façade was restored and the opera house reconstructed in a predominantly Art Deco style, as the result of a major competition. Currently the Opéra de Marseille stages six or seven operas each year.

Since 1972, the Ballet national de Marseille has performed at the opera house; its director from its foundation to 1998 was Roland Petit.

=== Popular events and festivals ===
There are several popular festivals in different neighborhoods, with concerts, animations, and outdoor bars, like the Fête du Panier in June. On 21 June, there are dozens of free concerts in the city as part of France's Fête de la Musique, featuring music from all over the world. Being free events, many Marseille residents attend.

Marseille hosts a Gay Pride event in early July. In 2013, Marseille hosted Europride, an international LGBT event, 10 July–20. At the beginning of July, there is the International Documentary Festival. At the end of September, the electronic music festival Marsatac takes place. In October, the Fiesta des Suds offers many concerts of world music.

=== Hip hop music ===
Marseille is also well known in France for its hip hop music. Bands like IAM originated from Marseille. Other known groups include Fonky Family, Psy 4 de la Rime (including rappers Soprano and Alonzo), and Keny Arkana. In a slightly different way, ragga music is represented by Massilia Sound System.

=== Food ===
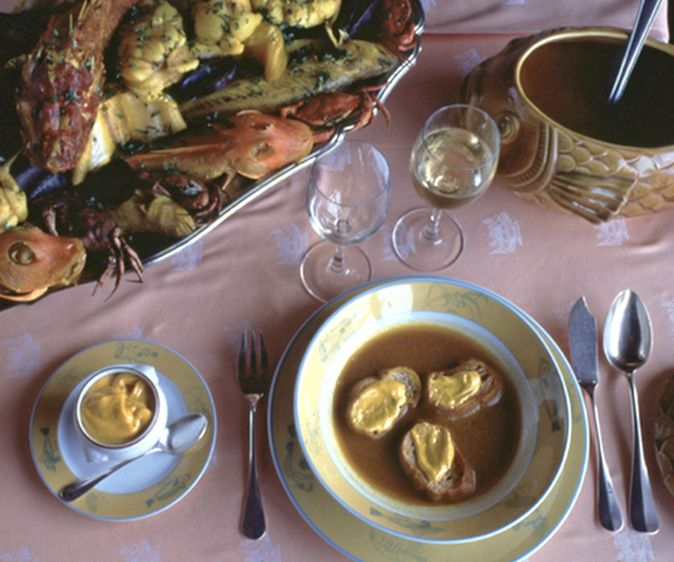
Traditional Marseille bouillabaisse

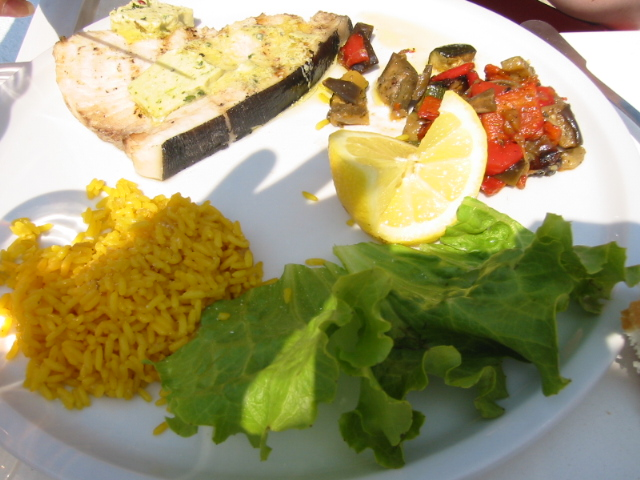
Swordfish in olive oil with ratatouille and saffron rice

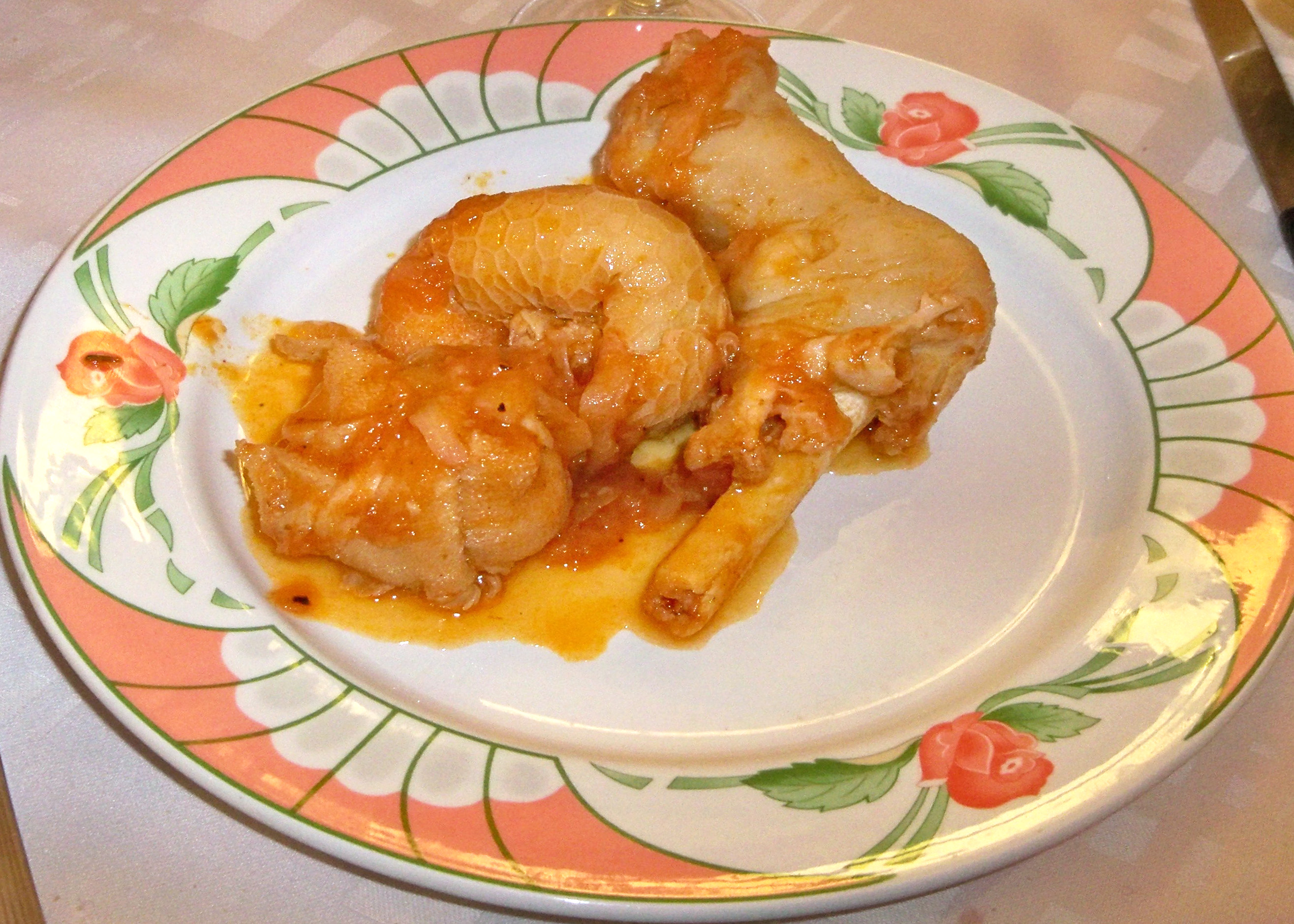
Pieds paquets

- Bouillabaisse is the most famous seafood dish of Marseille. It is a fish stew containing at least three varieties of very fresh local fish: typically red rascasse (Scorpaena scrofa); sea robin (fr: grondin); and European conger (fr: congre). It can include gilt-head bream (fr: dorade); turbot; monkfish (fr: lotte or baudroie); mullet; or silver hake (fr: merlan), and it usually includes shellfish and other seafood such as sea urchins (fr: oursins), mussels (fr: moules); velvet crabs (fr: étrilles); spider crab (fr: araignées de mer), plus potatoes and vegetables. In the traditional version, the fish is served on a platter separate from the broth. The broth is served with rouille, a mayonnaise made with egg yolk, olive oil, red bell pepper, saffron, and garlic, spread on pieces of toasted bread, or croûtons. In Marseille, bouillabaisse is rarely made for fewer than ten people.
- Aïoli is a sauce made from raw garlic, lemon juice, eggs and olive oil, served with boiled fish, hard boiled eggs and cooked vegetables.
- Anchoïade is a paste made from anchovies, garlic, and olive oil, spread on bread or served with raw vegetables.
- Bourride is a soup made with white fish (monkfish, European sea bass, whiting, etc.) and aïoli.
- Fougasse is a flat Provençal bread, similar to the Italian focaccia. It is traditionally baked in a wood oven and sometimes filled with olives, cheese or anchovies.
- Navette de Marseille are, in the words of food writer M. F. K. Fisher, "little boat-shaped cookies, tough dough tasting vaguely of orange peel, smelling better than they are." They are sold in one specific shop, dedicated to its fabrication since 1781 called "le four des navettes".
- Cade is chickpea flour boiled into a thick mush, allowed to firm up, then cut into blocks and fried.
- Pastis is an alcoholic beverage made with aniseed and spice. It is extremely popular in the region.
- Pieds paquets is a dish prepared from sheep's feet and offal.
- Pistou is a combination of crushed fresh basil and garlic with olive oil, similar to the Italian pesto. The "soupe au pistou" combines pistou in a broth with pasta and vegetables.
- Tapenade is a paste made from chopped olives, capers, and olive oil (sometimes anchovies may be added).

=== Marseille Dialect ===
The Marseille dialect, a variant of the French language influenced by Provençal, is renowned for its colloquial and melodious nature. It is characterized by an exaggerative style and also incorporates influences from Arabic, Italian, and other local dialects. Despite its colorful expressions, the dialect remains predominantly localized to the city of Marseille, with limited use beyond the region.

Common expressions in the Marseille dialect include:

- Fada: Refers to a person who is considered eccentric, cheeky, or almost crazy.
- Oh fan!: An exclamation used to express surprise, annoyance, or frustration.
- Minot: A term for a child.
- Peuchère: An expression of sympathy or even pity, often used to convey empathy for someone.
- Emboucaner: To drive someone crazy or to irritate them.

=== Films set in Marseille ===
Marseille has been the setting for many films.

=== Media ===
France's national public television broadcaster has a regional television service, France 3 Provence-Alpes which broadcast from the city. The service produces regional news and entertainment, including coverage of local personalities, history and culture from across Provence-Alpes-Côte d'Azur.

Radio stations that broadcast to Marseille are Ici Provence (part of the national public radio broadcaster,Radio France) on 103.6 FM, Radio Soleil on 87.7 FM, and Sud Radio on 95.1 FM.

Two local newspapers are published in Marseille are La Provence and La Marseillaise

== Main sights ==
Marseille is listed as a major centre of art and history. The city has many museums and galleries and there are many ancient buildings and churches of historical interest.

=== Central Marseille ===
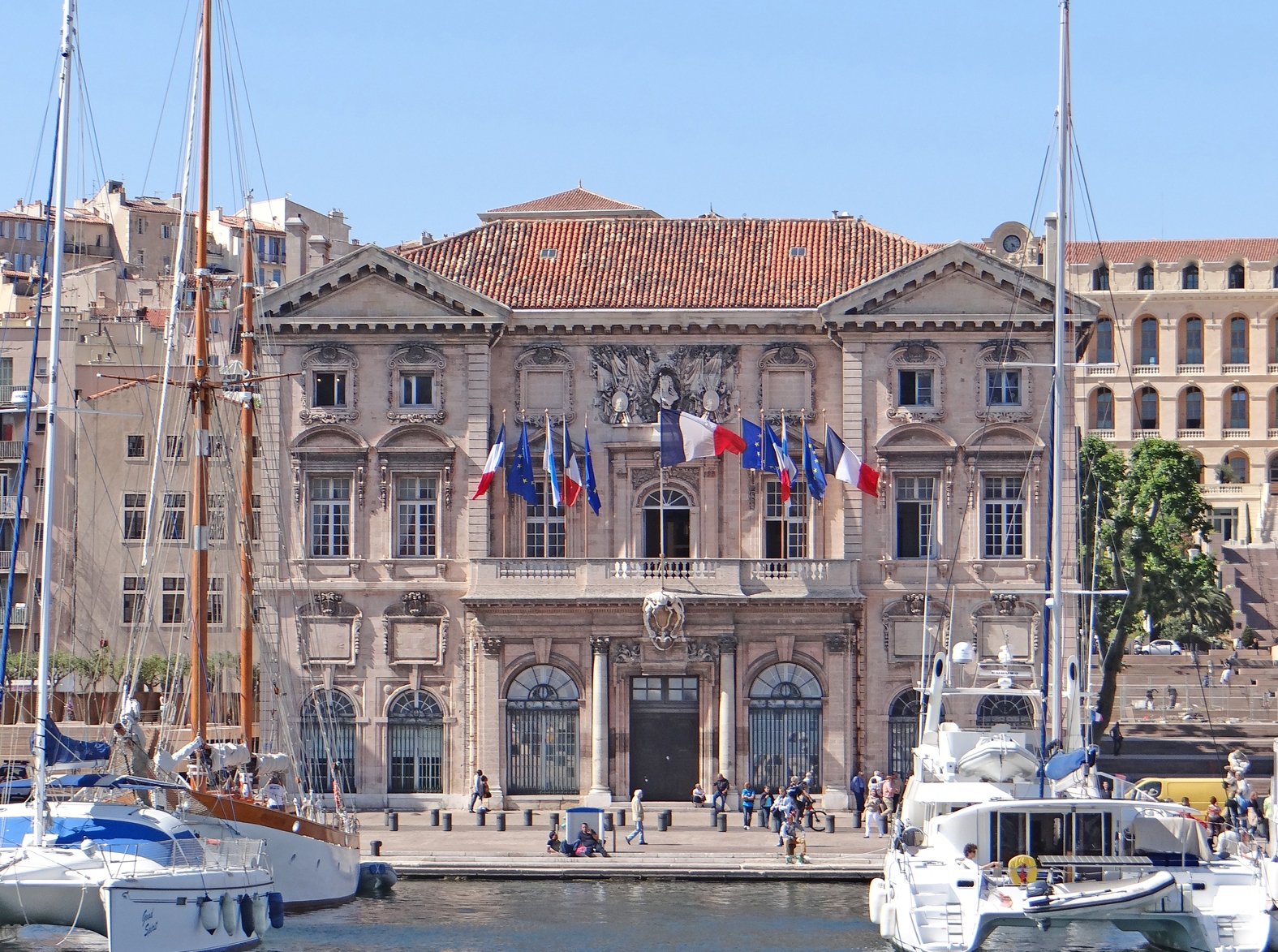
Le Panier quarter with the Hotel de Ville and the church of Notre-Dame des Accoules

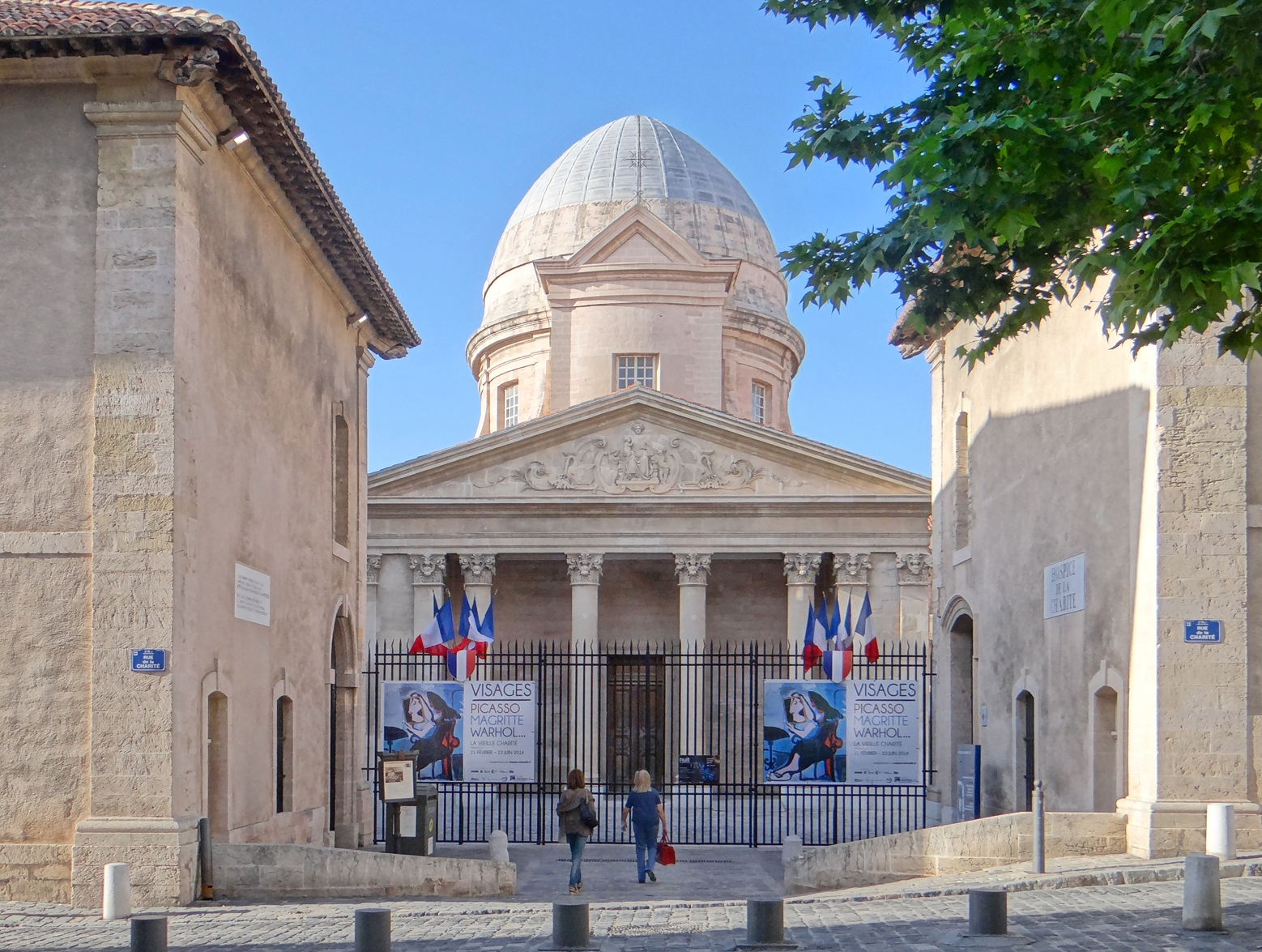
La Vieille Charité

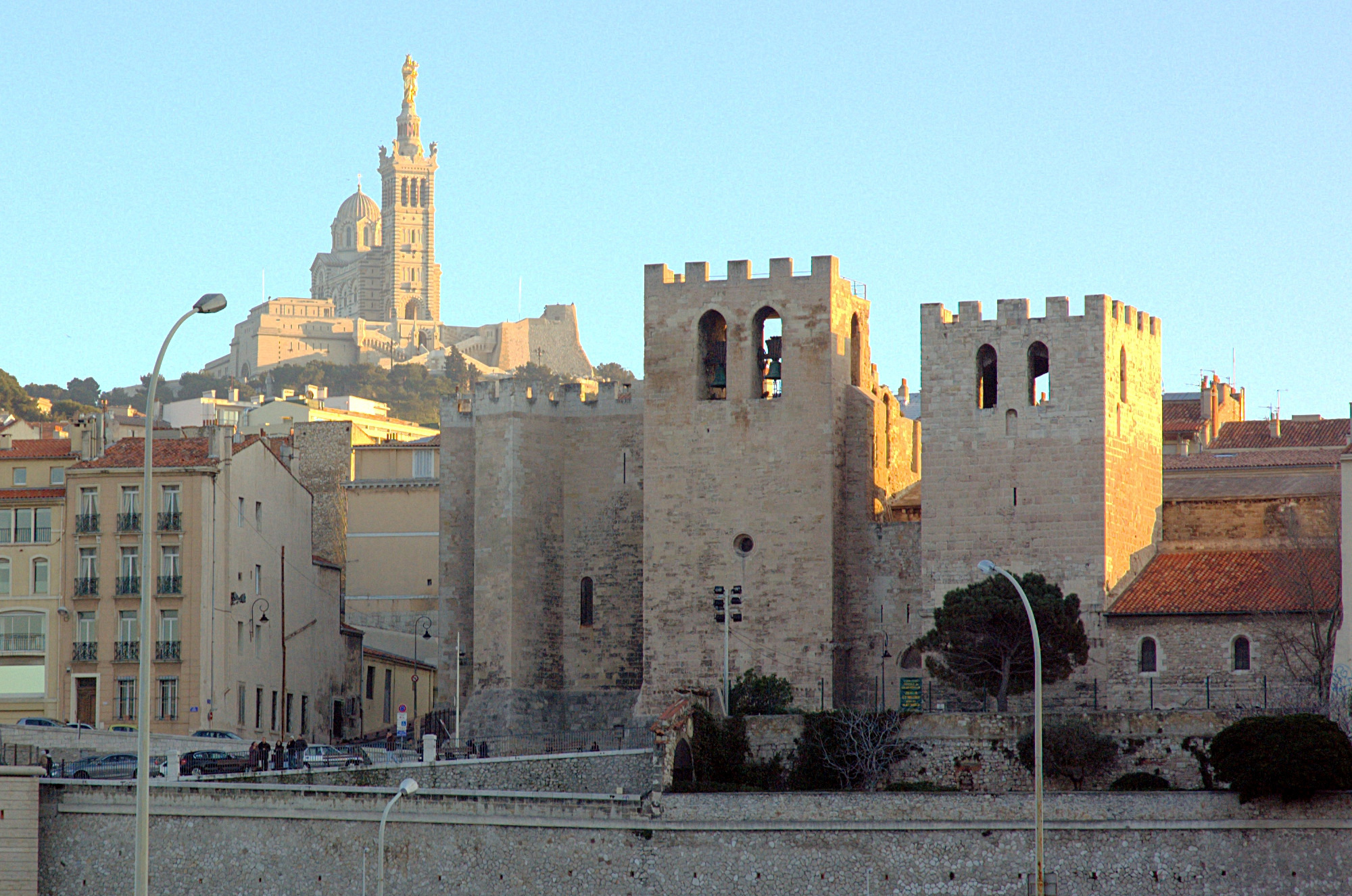
The Abbey of St. Victor and the basilica of Notre-Dame de la Garde

Most of the attractions of Marseille (including shopping areas) are located in the 1st, 2nd, 6th and 7th arrondissements. These include:

- The Old Port or Vieux-Port, the main harbour and marina of the city. It is guarded by two massive forts (Fort Saint-Nicolas and Fort Saint-Jean) and is one of the main places to eat in the city. Dozens of cafés line the waterfront. The Quai des Belges at the end of the harbour is the site of the daily fish market. Much of the northern quayside area was rebuilt by the architect Fernand Pouillon after its destruction by the Nazis in 1943.
- The Hôtel de Ville (City Hall), a baroque building dating from the 17th century.
- The Centre Bourse and the adjacent Rue St Ferreol district (including Rue de Rome and Rue Paradis), the main shopping area in central Marseille.
- The Porte d'Aix, a triumphal arch commemorating French victories in the Spanish Expedition.
- The Hôtel-Dieu, a former hospital in Le Panier, transformed into an InterContinental hotel in 2013.
- La Vieille Charité in Le Panier, an architecturally significant building designed by the Puget brothers. The central baroque chapel is situated in a courtyard lined with arcaded galleries. Originally built as an alms house, it is now home to an archeological museum and a gallery of African and Asian art, as well as bookshops and a café. It also houses the Marseille International Poetry Centre.
- The Cathedral of Sainte-Marie-Majeure or La Major, founded in the fourth century, enlarged in the 11th century and completely rebuilt in the second half of the 19th century by the architects Léon Vaudoyer and Henri-Jacques Espérandieu. The present day cathedral is a gigantic edifice in Romano-Byzantine style. A romanesque transept, choir and altar survive from the older medieval cathedral, spared from complete destruction only as a result of public protests at the time.
- The 12th-century parish church of Saint-Laurent and adjoining 17th-century chapel of Sainte-Catherine, on the quayside near the cathedral.
- The Abbey of Saint-Victor, one of the oldest places of Christian worship in Europe. Its fifth-century crypt and catacombs occupy the site of a Hellenic burial ground, later used for Christian martyrs and venerated ever since. Continuing a medieval tradition, every year at Candlemas a Black Madonna from the crypt is carried in procession along Rue Sainte for a blessing from the archbishop, followed by a mass and the distribution of "navettes" and green votive candles.

=== Museums ===
In addition to the two in the Centre de la Vieille Charité, described above, the main museums are:

- The Musée des Civilisations de l'Europe et de la Méditerranée (MuCEM) and the Villa Méditerranée were inaugurated in 2013. The MuCEM is devoted to the history and culture of European and Mediterranean civilisations. The adjacent Villa Méditerranée, by Stefano Boeri, an international centre for cultural and artistic interchange, is partially constructed underwater. Since 2022, it houses a replica of the Cosquer Cave and associated exhibitions. The site is linked by footbridges to the Fort Saint-Jean and to the Panier.
- The Musée Regards de Provence, opened in 2013, is located between the Cathedral of Notre Dame de la Majeur and the Fort Saint-Jean. It occupies a converted port building constructed in 1945 to monitor and control potential sea-borne health hazards, in particular epidemics. It now houses a permanent collection of historical artworks from Provence as well as temporary exhibitions.
- The Musée des Docks Romains preserves in situ the remains of Roman commercial warehouses, and has a small collection of objects, dating from the Greek period to the Middle Ages, that were uncovered on the site or retrieved from shipwrecks.
- The Marseille History Museum (Musée d'Histoire de Marseille), devoted to the history of the town, located in the Centre Bourse. It contains remains of the Greek, and Roman history of Marseille as well as the best preserved hull of a sixth-century boat in the world. Ancient remains from the Hellenic port are displayed in the adjacent archeological gardens, the Jardin des Vestiges.
- The Musée Cantini, a museum of modern art near the Palais de Justice. It houses artworks associated with Marseille as well as several works by Picasso.
- The Musée Grobet-Labadié, opposite the Palais Longchamp, houses an exceptional collection of European objets d'art and old musical instruments.
- The 19th-century Palais Longchamp, designed by Esperandieu, is located in the Parc Longchamp. Built on a grand scale, this italianate colonnaded building rises up behind a vast monumental fountain with cascading waterfalls. The jeux d'eau marks and masks the entry point of the Canal de Provence into Marseille. Its two wings house the Musée des beaux-arts de Marseille (a fine arts museum), and the Natural History Museum (Muséum d'histoire naturelle de Marseille).
- The Château Borély is located in the Parc Borély, a park off the Bay of Marseille with the Jardin botanique E.M. Heckel, a botanical garden. The Museum of the Decorative Arts, Fashion and Ceramics opened in the renovated château in June 2013.
- The Musée d'Art Contemporain de Marseille (MAC), a museum of contemporary art, opened in 1994. It is devoted to American and European art from the 1960s to the present day.
- The Musée du Terroir Marseillais in Château-Gombert, devoted to Provençal crafts and traditions.
The MuCEM, Musée Regards de Provence and Villa Mediterannée, with Notre Dame de la Majeur on the right

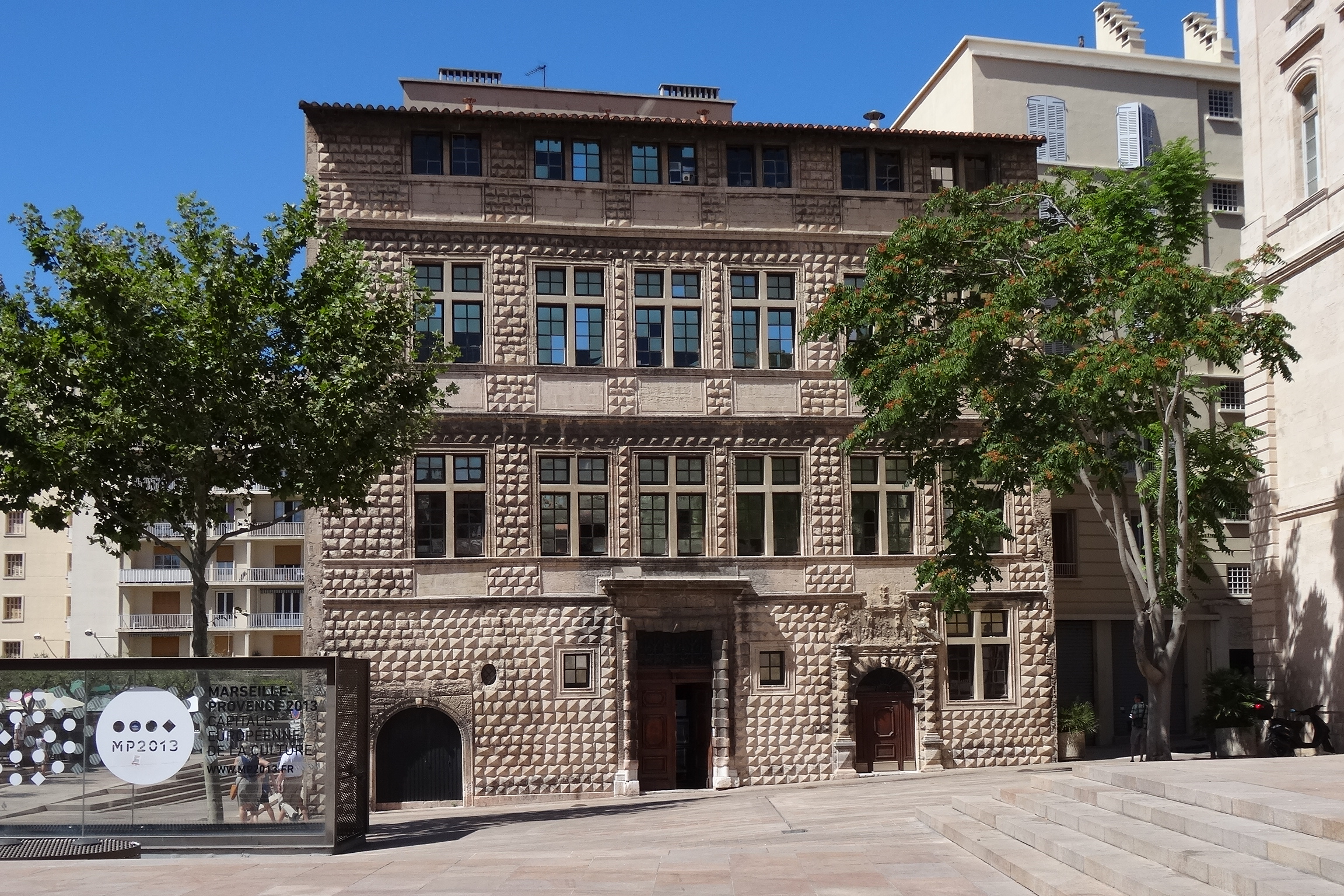
The sixteenth century Maison Diamantée now houses municipal offices

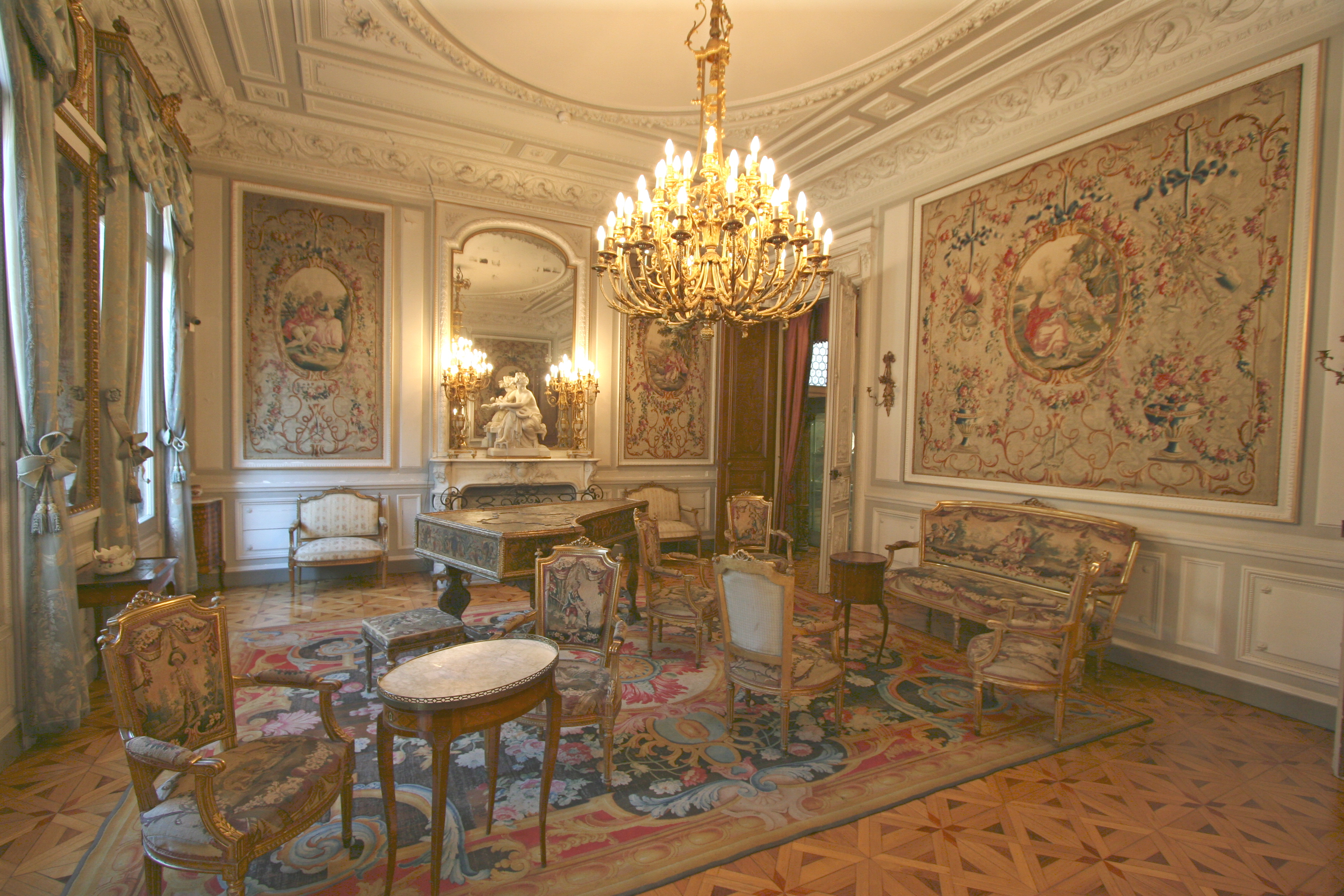
The music room in the Grobet-Labadié museum

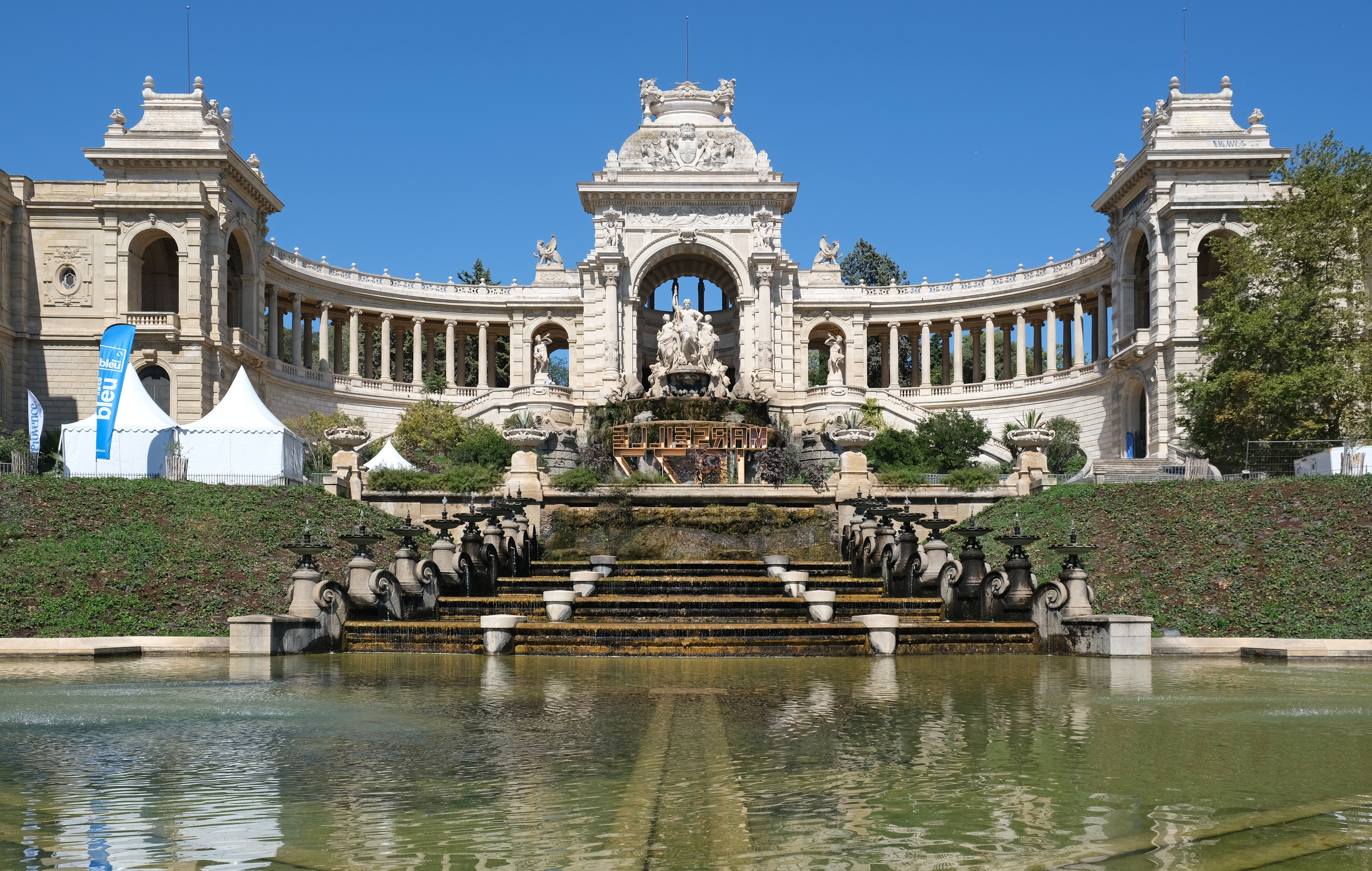
The Palais Longchamp with its monumental fountain

=== Outside central Marseille ===
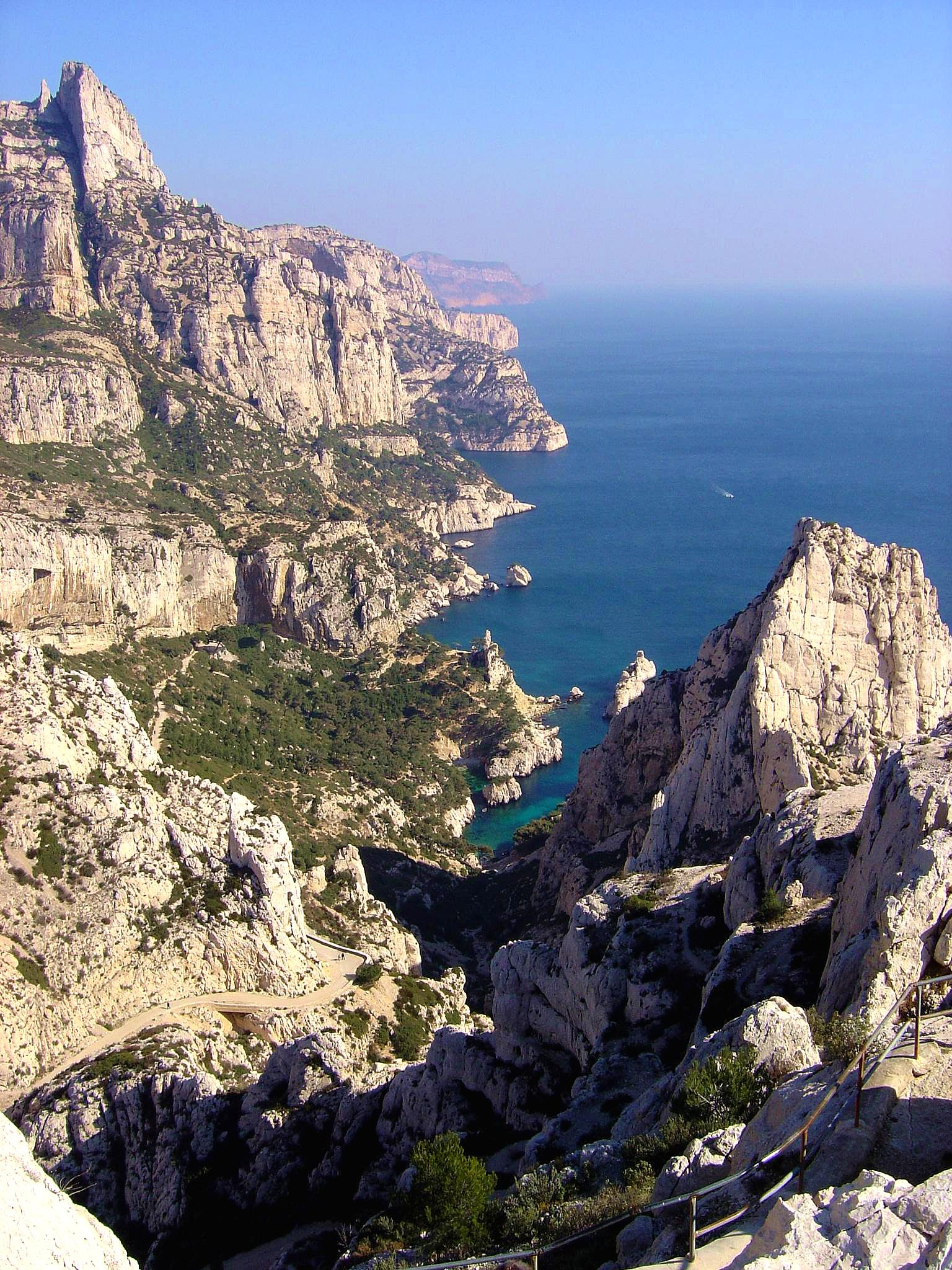
The Calanque de Sugiton in the 9th arrondissement of Marseille

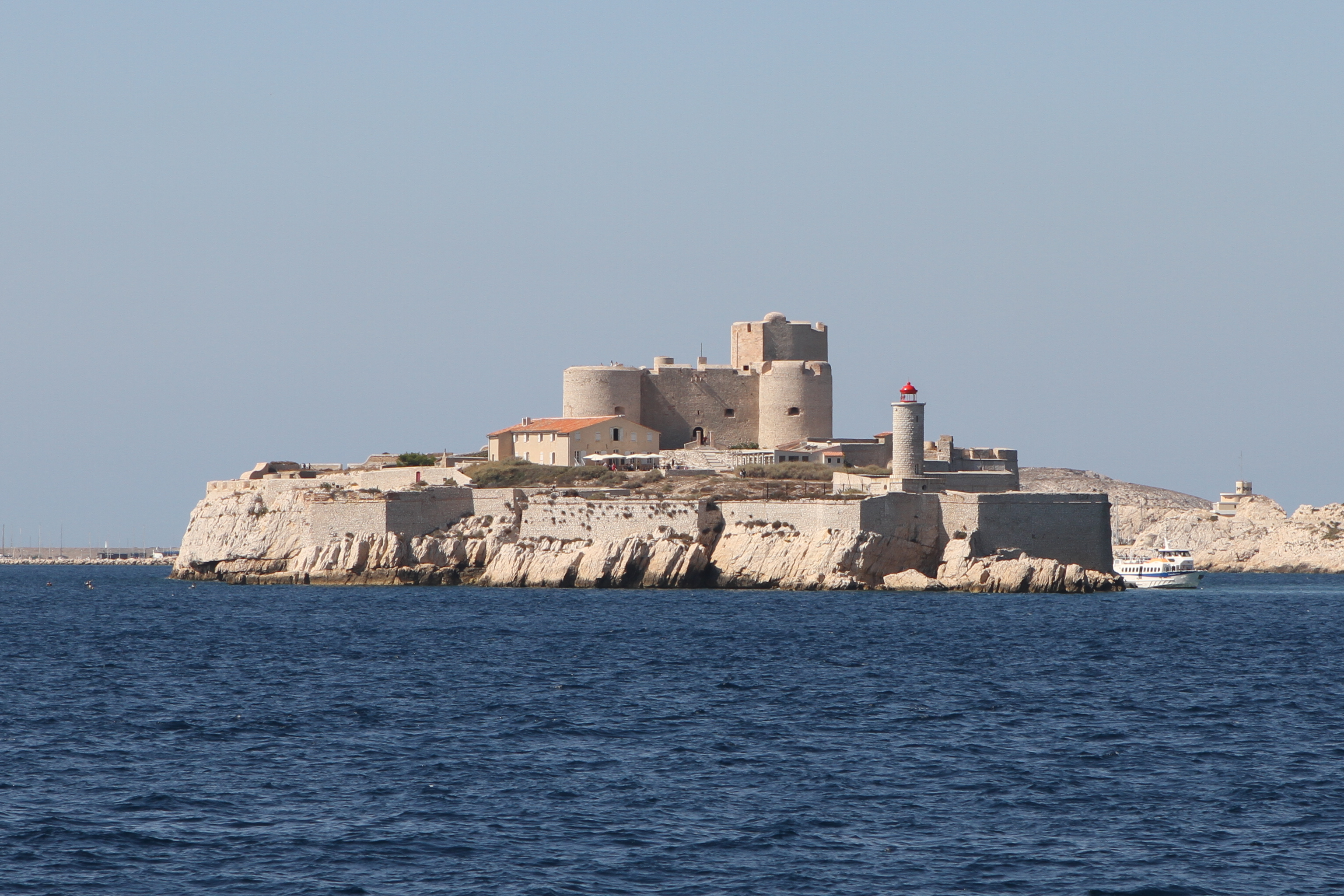
The Château d'If

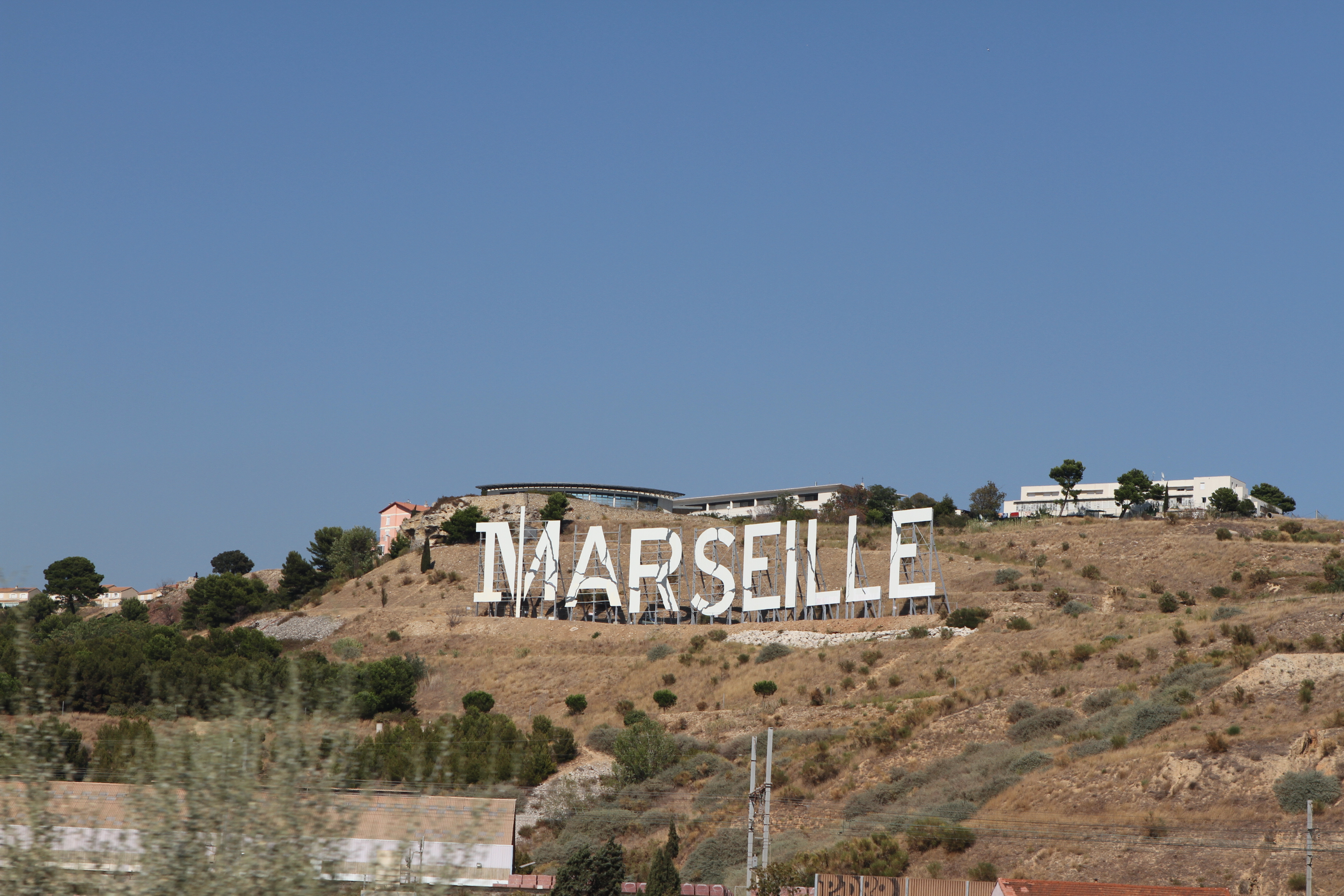
Hollywood-style "Marseille" sign

The main attractions outside the city centre include:

- The 19th-century Basilica of Notre-Dame de la Garde, an enormous Romano-Byzantine basilica built by architect Espérandieu in the hills to the south of the Old Port. The terrace offers views of Marseille and its surroundings.
- The Stade Vélodrome, the home stadium of the city's main football team, Olympique de Marseille.
- The Unité d'Habitation, an influential and iconic modernist building designed by the Swiss architect Le Corbusier in 1952. On the third floor is the gastronomic restaurant, Le Ventre de l'Architecte. On the roof is the contemporary gallery MaMo opened in 2013.
- The Docks de Marseille, a 19th-century warehouse transformed into offices.
- The Pharo Gardens, a park with views of the Mediterranean and the Old Port.
- The Corniche, a waterfront road between the Old Port and the Bay of Marseille.
- The beaches at the Prado, Pointe Rouge, Les Goudes, Callelongue and Le Prophète.
- The Calanques, a mountainous coastal area, is home to Calanques National Park which became France's tenth national park in 2012.
- The islands of the Frioul archipelago in the Bay of Marseille, accessible by ferry from the Old Port. The prison of Château d'If was one of the settings for The Count of Monte Cristo, the novel by Alexandre Dumas. The neighbouring islands of Ratonneau and Pomègues are joined by a human-made breakwater. The site of a former garrison and quarantine hospital, these islands are also of interest for their marine wildlife.

== Education ==
A number of the faculties of the three universities that comprise Aix-Marseille University are located in Marseille:

- University of Provence
- Université de la Méditerranée Aix-Marseille II
- Université Paul Cézanne Aix-Marseille III

In addition Marseille has four grandes écoles:

- Ecole Centrale de Marseille part of Centrale Graduate School
- École pour l'informatique et les nouvelles technologies
- Institut polytechnique des sciences avancées
- KEDGE Business School

The main French research bodies including the CNRS, INSERM and INRA are all well represented in Marseille. Scientific research is concentrated at several sites across the city, including Luminy, where there are institutes in developmental biology (the IBDML), immunology (CIML), marine sciences and neurobiology (INMED), at the CNRS Joseph Aiguier campus (a world-renowned institute of molecular and environmental microbiology) and at the Timone hospital site (known for work in medical microbiology). Marseille is also home to the headquarters of the IRD, which promotes research into questions affecting developing countries.

== Transport ==
=== International and regional transport ===
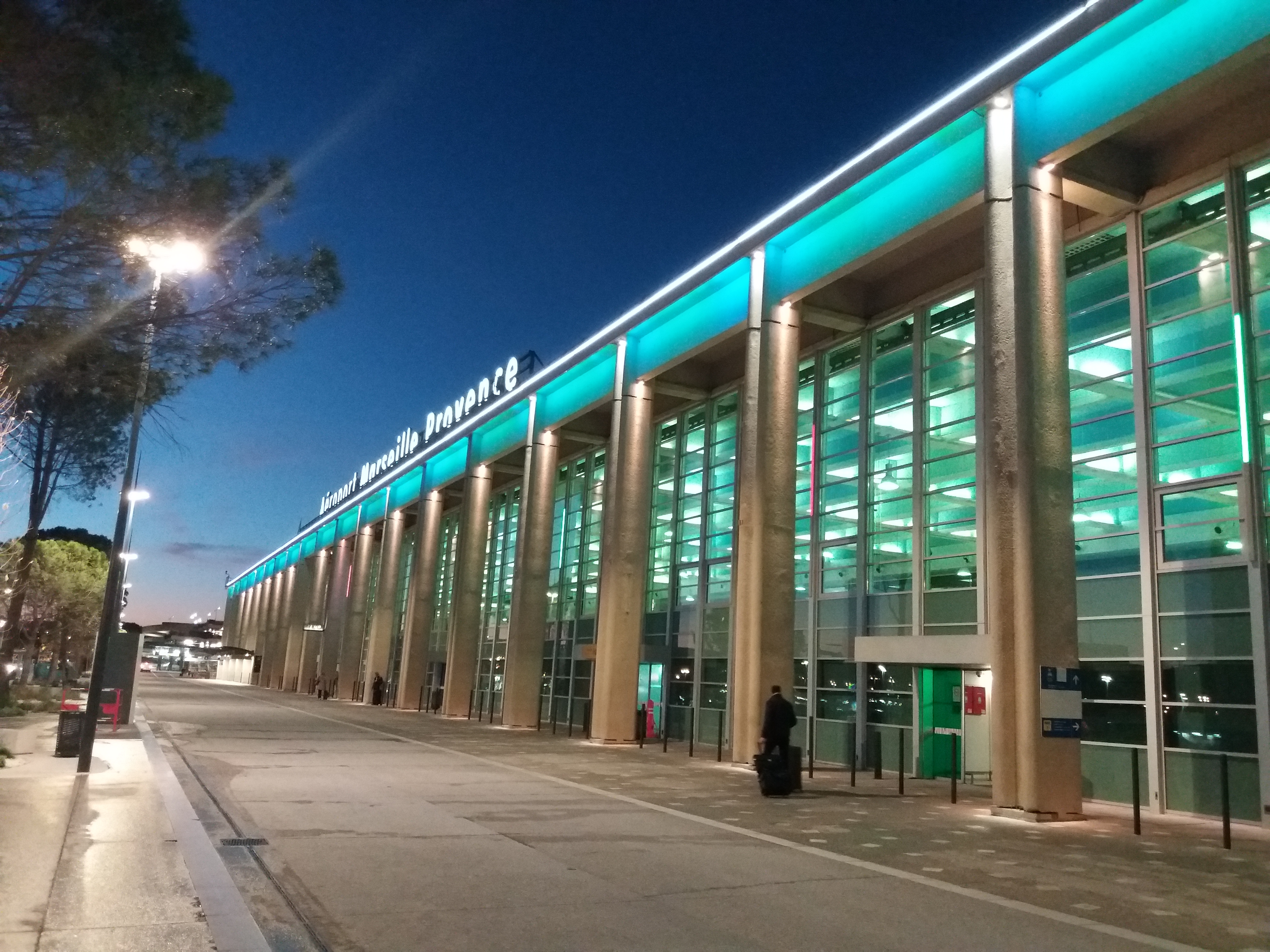
Marseille Provence Airport, the fifth busiest in France

Motorways around Marseille

The city is served by an international airport, Marseille Provence Airport, located in Marignane. The airport is the fifth busiest French airport, was known as the fourth most important European traffic growth in 2012. An extensive network of motorways connects Marseille to the north and west (A7), Aix-en-Provence in the north (A51), Toulon (A50) and the French Riviera to the east (A8). It is the most populous city in the French Riviera.

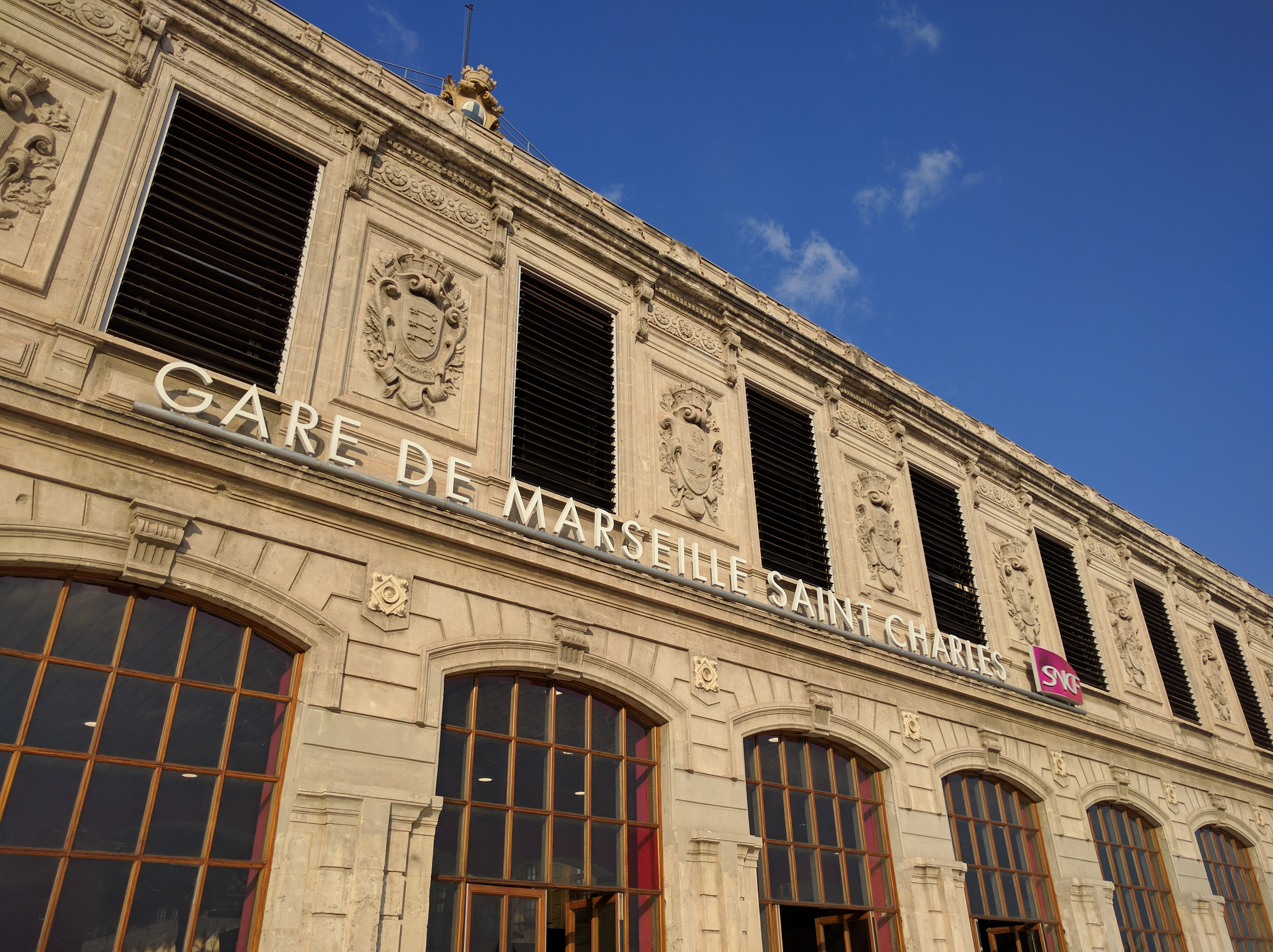
Front view of Marseille-Saint-Charles station showing its stone exterior, arched windows and engraved architectural details.

Gare de Marseille Saint-Charles is Marseille's main railway station. It operates direct regional services to Aix-en-Provence, Briançon, Toulon, Avignon, Nice, Montpellier, Toulouse, Bordeaux, Nantes, etc. Gare Saint-Charles is also one of the main terminal stations for the TGV in the south of France making Marseille reachable in three hours from Paris (a distance of over 750 km) and just over one and a half hours from Lyon. There are also direct TGV lines to Lille, Brussels, Nantes, Geneva, Strasbourg and Frankfurt as well as Eurostar services to London (just in the summer) and Thello services to Milan (just one a day), via Nice and Genoa.

There is a new long-distance bus station adjacent to new modern extension to the Gare Saint-Charles with destinations mostly to other Bouches-du-Rhône towns, including buses to Aix-en-Provence, Cassis, La Ciotat and Aubagne. The city is also served with 11 other regional trains stations in the east and the north of the city, including Marseille-Blancarde.

Marseille has a large ferry terminal, the Gare Maritime, with services to Corsica, Sardinia, Algeria and Tunisia.

=== Public transport ===
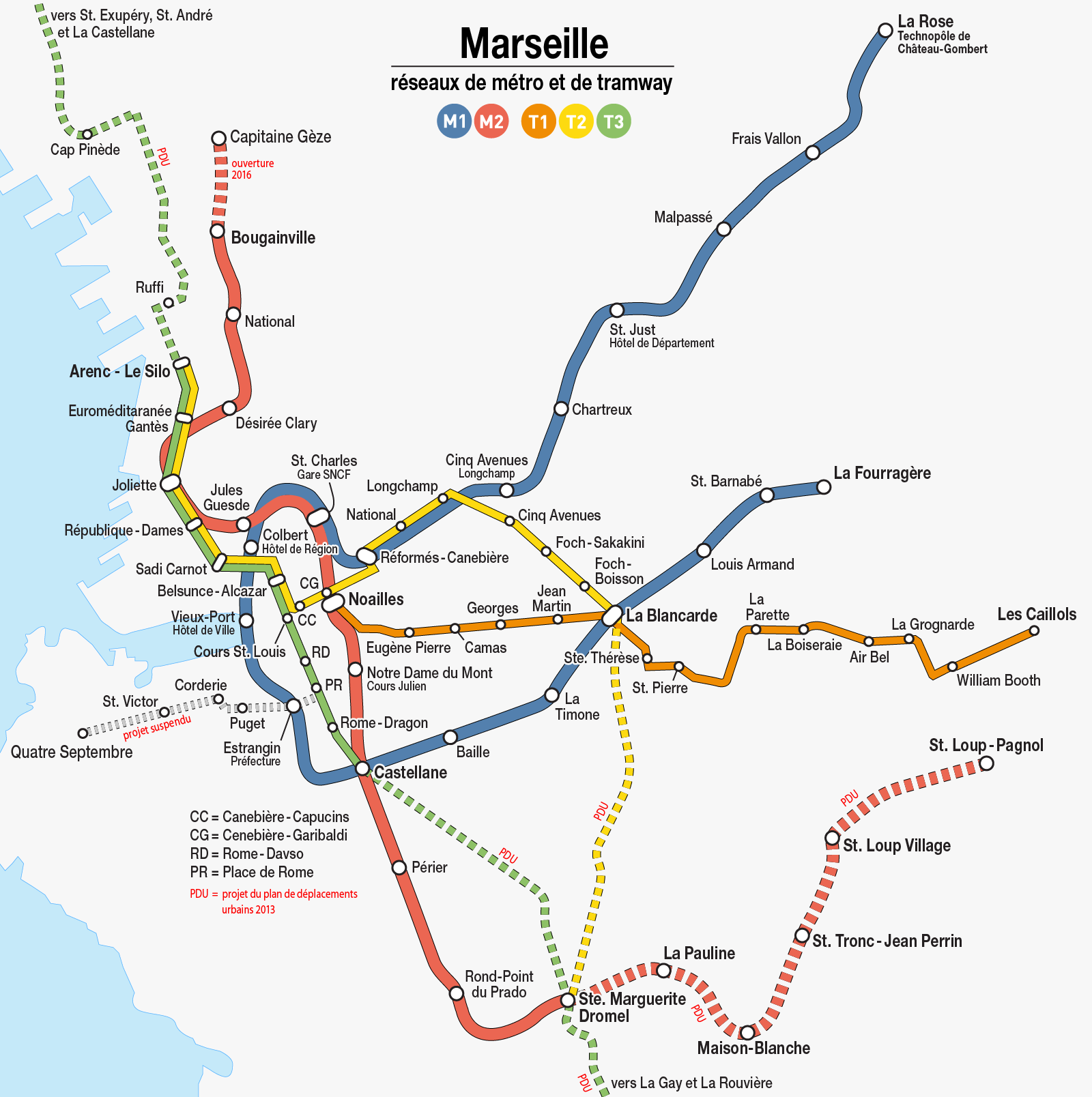
Metro and tramway network

Marseille is connected by the Marseille Métro train system operated by the Régie des transports de Marseille (RTM). It consists of two lines: Line 1 (blue) between Castellane and La Rose opened in 1977 and Line 2 (red) between Sainte-Marguerite-Dromel and Bougainville opened between 1984 and 1987. An extension of the Line 1 from Castellane to La Timone was completed in 1992, another extension from La Timone to La Fourragère (2.5 km (1.6 mi) and 4 new stations) was opened in May 2010. The Métro system operates on a turnstile system, with tickets purchased at the nearby adjacent automated booths. Both lines of the Métro intersect at Gare Saint-Charles and Castellane. Three bus rapid transit lines are under construction to better connect the Métro to farther places (Castellane -> Luminy; Capitaine Gèze – La Cabucelle -> Vallon des Tuves; La Rose -> Château Gombert – Saint Jérôme).

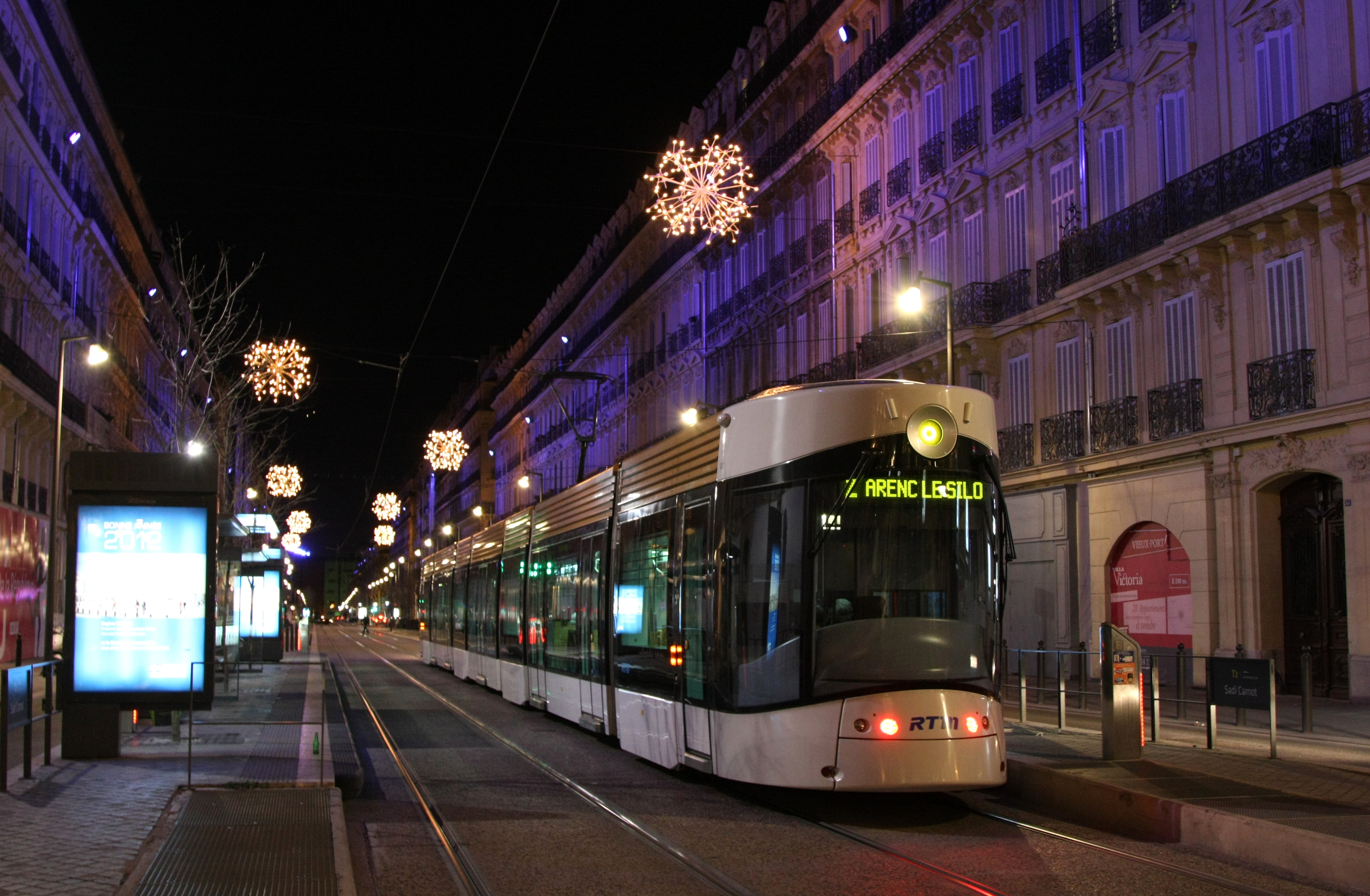
The new tramway

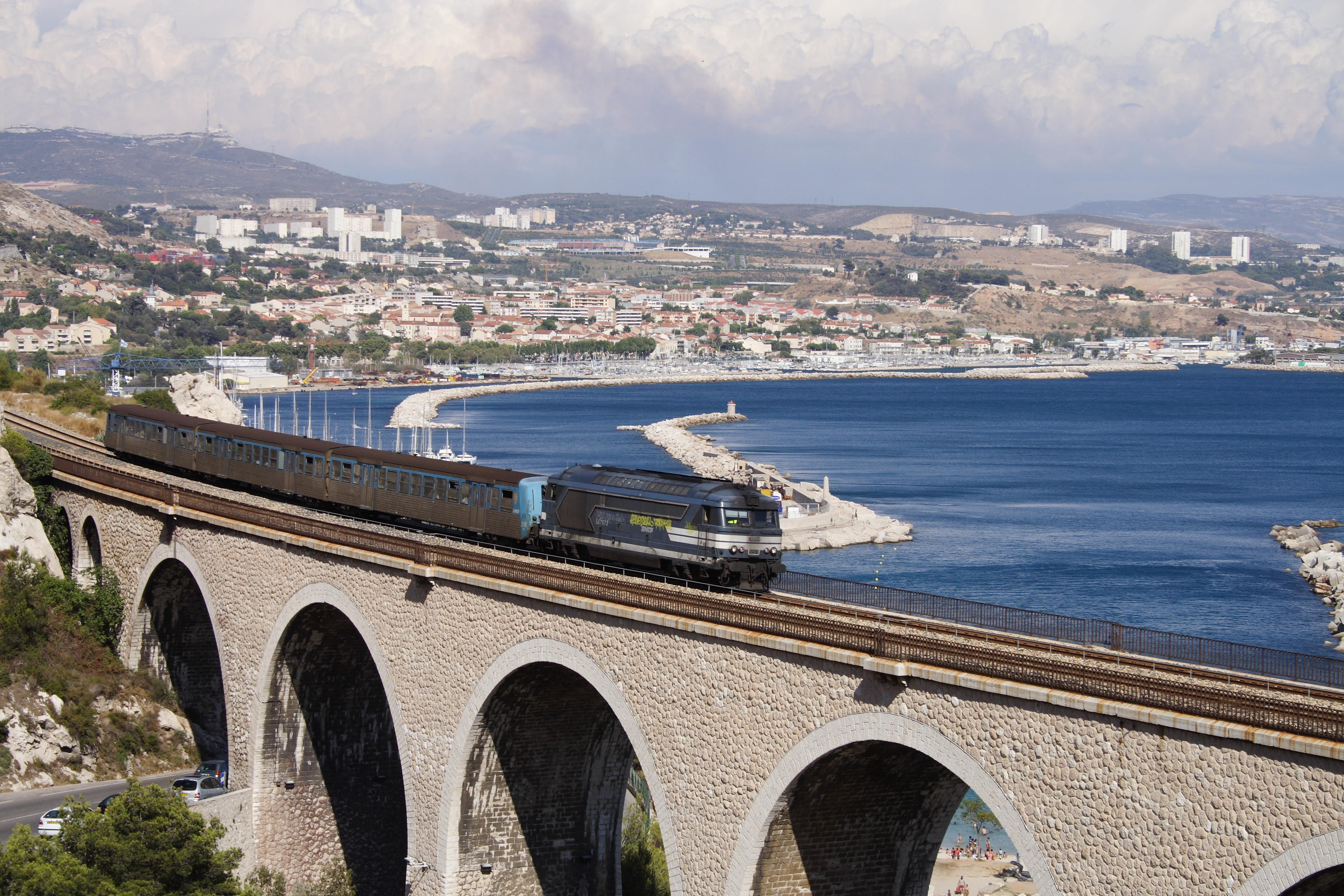
SNCF BB 67400 (567573) on the Viaduc de Corbières, near L'Estaque and towards the Côte Bleue, 2006

An extensive bus network serves the city and suburbs of Marseille, with 104 lines and 633 buses. The three lines of the tramway, opened in 2007, go from the CMA CGM Tower towards Les Caillols.

As in many other French cities, a bike-sharing service nicknamed "Le vélo", free for trips of less than half an hour, was introduced by the city council in 2007.

A free ferry service operates between the two opposite quays of the Old Port. From 2011 ferry shuttle services operate between the Old Port and Pointe Rouge; in spring 2013 it will also run to l'Estaque. There are also ferry services and boat trips available from the Old Port to Frioul, the Calanques and Cassis.

== Sport ==
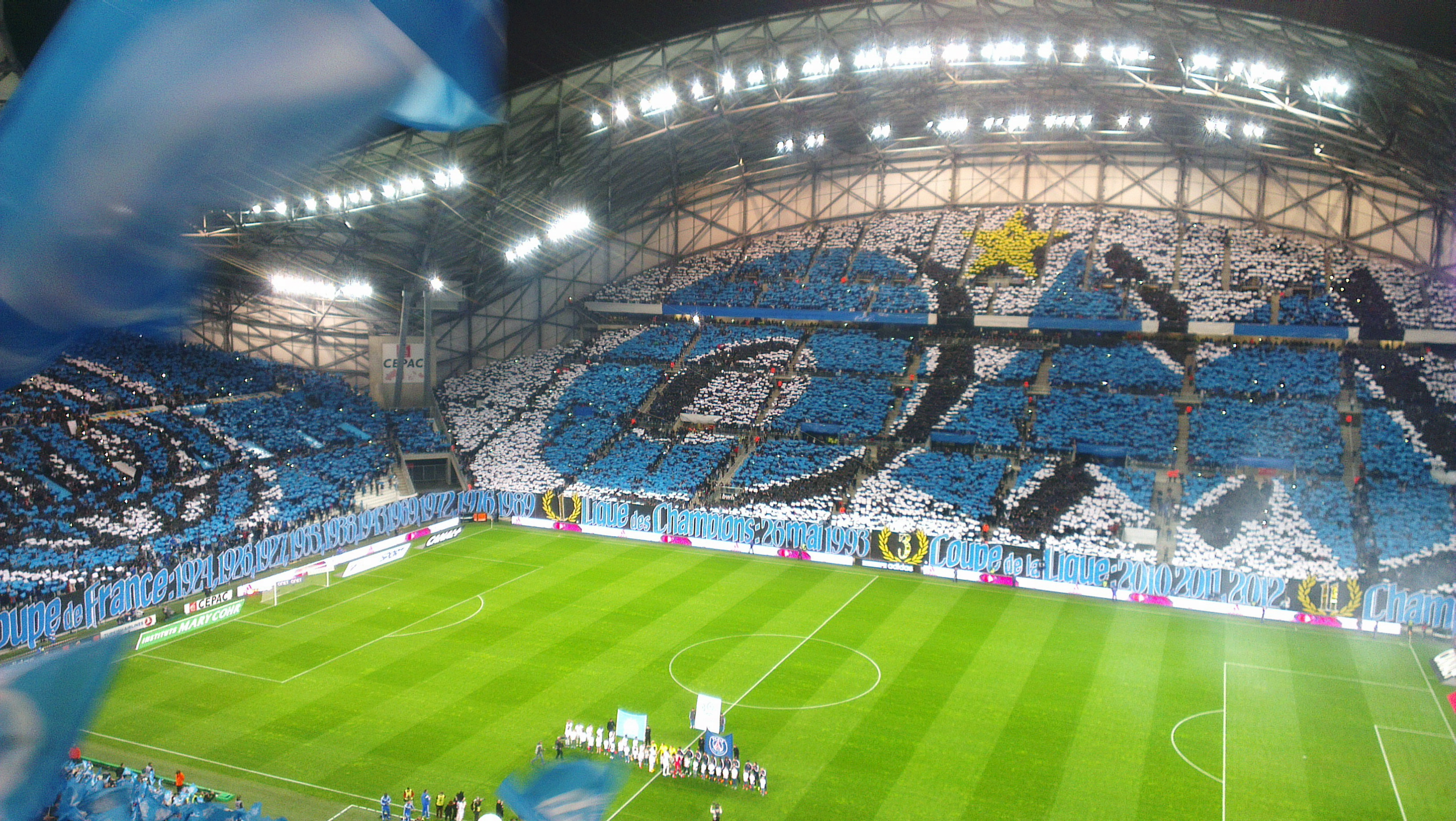
The Stade Vélodrome, home of Olympique de Marseille

The city boasts a wide variety of sports facilities and teams. The most popular team is the city's football club, Olympique de Marseille, which was the finalist of the UEFA Champions League in 1991, before becoming the first French winner of the competition in 1993. The club also became finalists of the UEFA Europa League in 1999, 2004 and 2018. The club had a history of success under then-owner Bernard Tapie. The club's home, the Stade Vélodrome, which can seat around 67,000 people, also functions for other local sports, as well as the national rugby team. Stade Velodrome hosted a number of games during the 1998 FIFA World Cup, 2007 Rugby World Cup, UEFA Euro 2016 and 2023 Rugby World Cup. The local rugby teams are Marseille XIII Avenir and Marseille Vitrolles Rugby.

Marseille is famous for its important pétanque activity, it is even renowned as the pétanque capitale. In 2012 Marseille hosted the Pétanque World Championship and the city hosts every year the Mondial la Marseillaise de pétanque, the main pétanque competition.

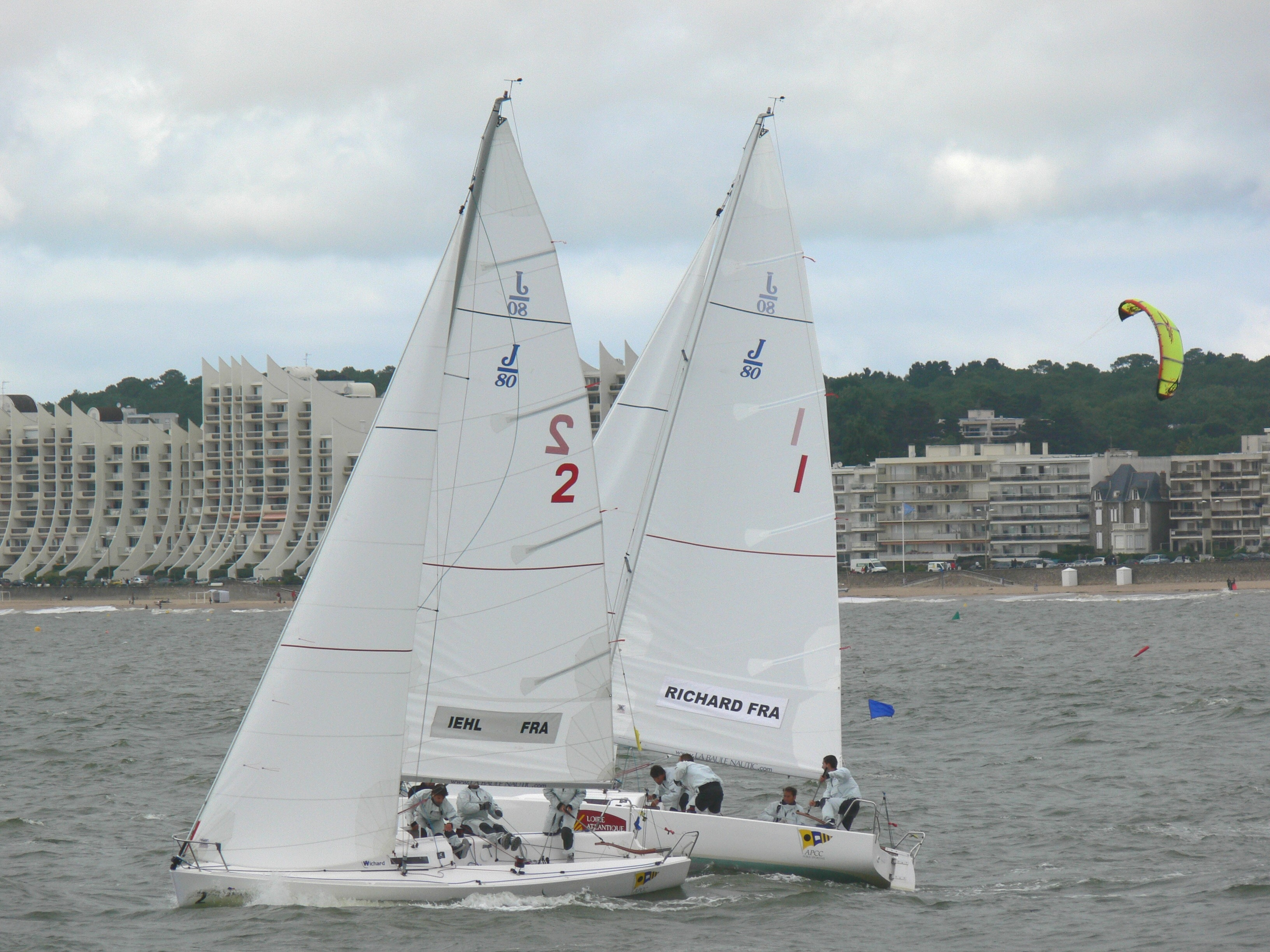
Match Race France 2008

Sailing is a major sport in Marseille. The wind conditions allow regattas in the warm waters of the Mediterranean. Throughout most seasons of the year it can be windy while the sea remains smooth enough to allow sailing. Marseille has been the host of 8 (2010) Match Race France events which are part of the World Match Racing Tour. The event draws the world's best sailing teams to Marseille. The identical supplied boats (J Boats J-80 racing yachts) are raced two at a time in an on the water dogfight which tests the sailors and skippers to the limits of their physical abilities. Points accrued count towards the World Match Racing Tour and a place in the final event, with the overall winner taking the title ISAF World Match Racing Tour Champion. Match racing is an ideal sport for spectators in Marseille, as racing in close proximity to the shore provides excellent views. The city was also considered as a possible venue for 2007 America's Cup.

CN Marseille has traditionally been one of France's dominant Water polo teams as it won the Championnat de France a total of 36 times.

Marseille is also a place for other water sports such as windsurfing and powerboating. Marseille has three golf courses. The city has dozens of gyms and several public swimming pools. Running is also popular in many of Marseille's parks such as Le Pharo and Le Jardin Pierre Puget. An annual footrace is held between the city and neighbouring Cassis: the Marseille-Cassis Classique Internationale.

The 2025 Tour de la Provence began in Marseille with stage 1 on 14 February 2025.

== Notable people ==
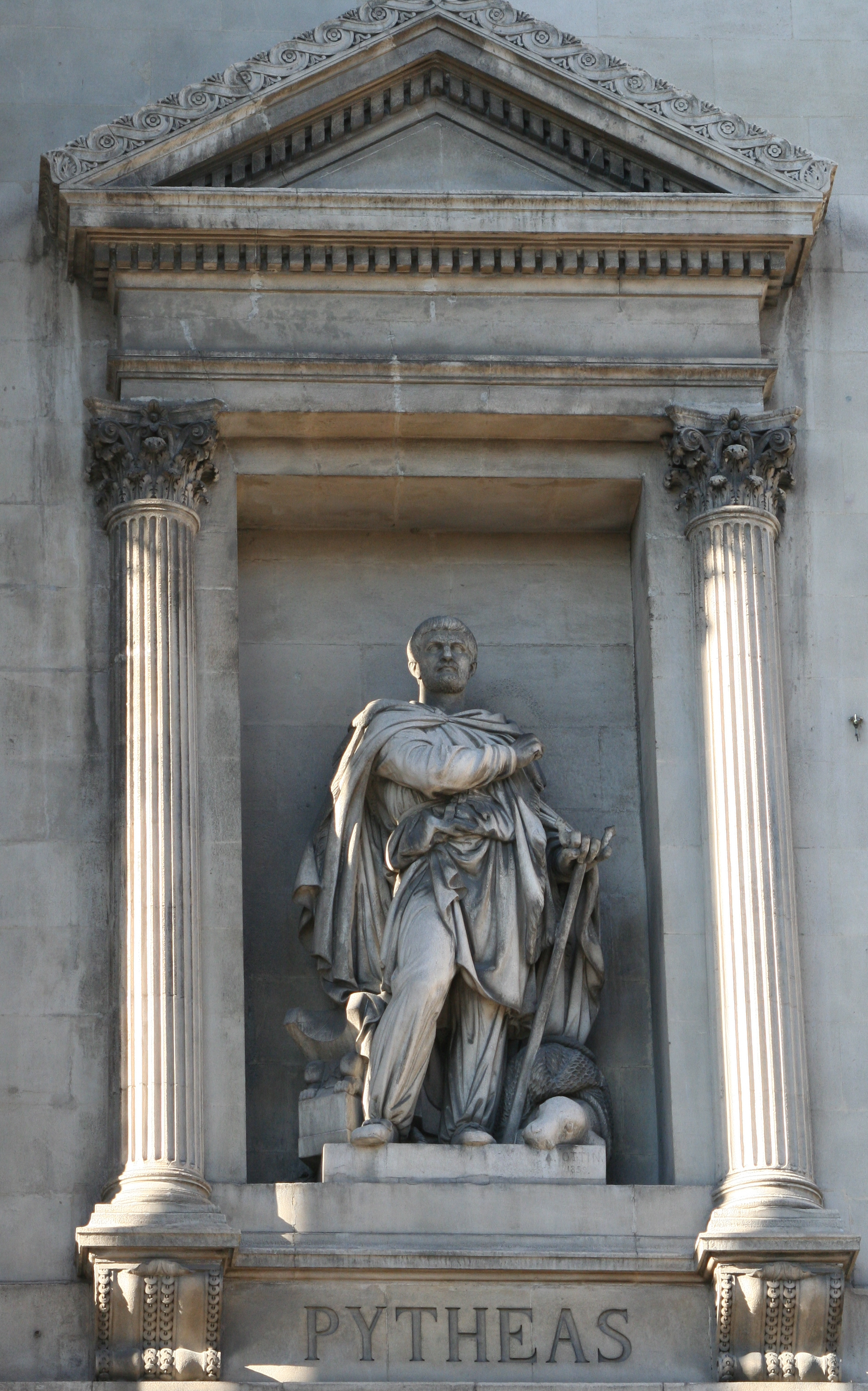
Pytheas

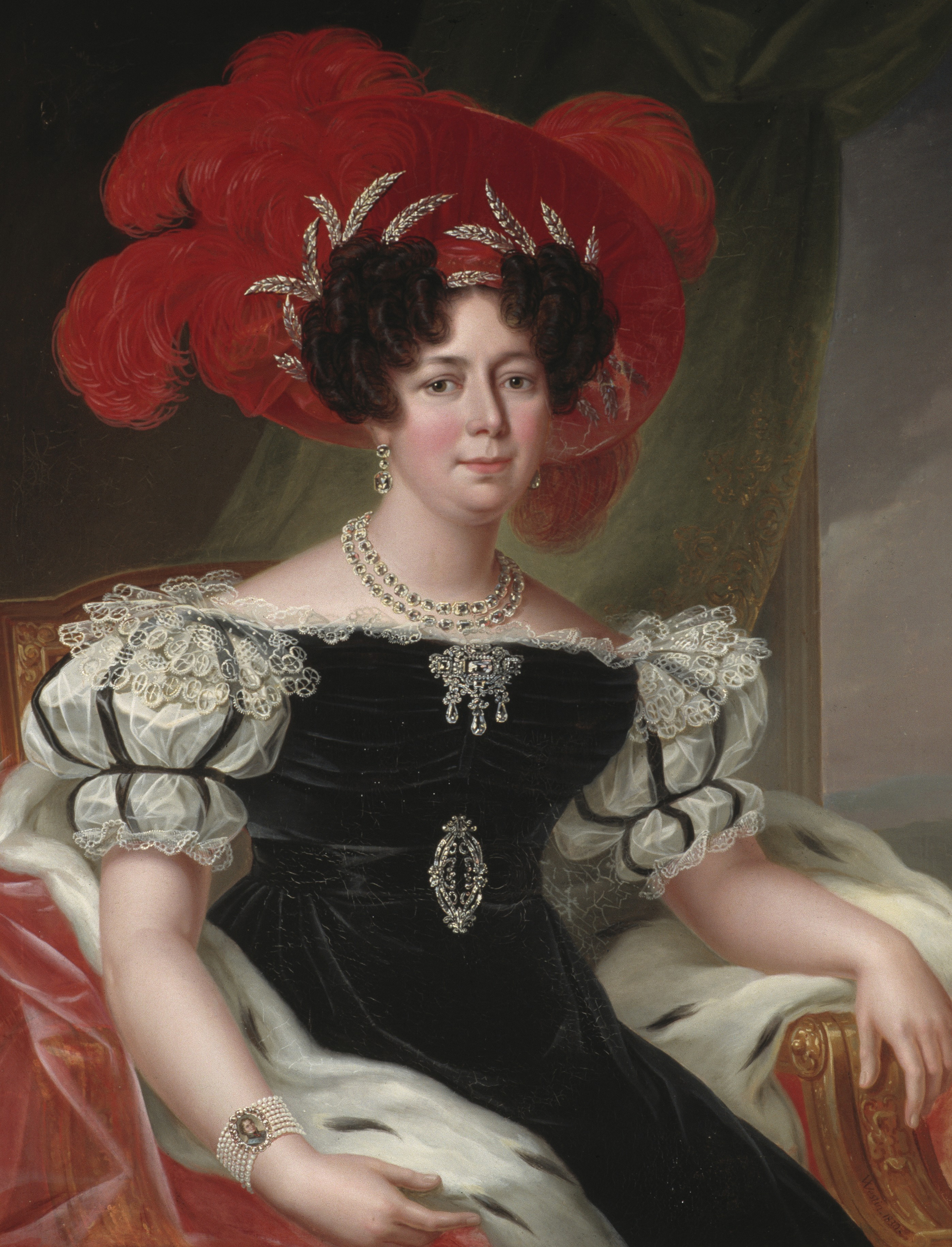
Désirée Clary

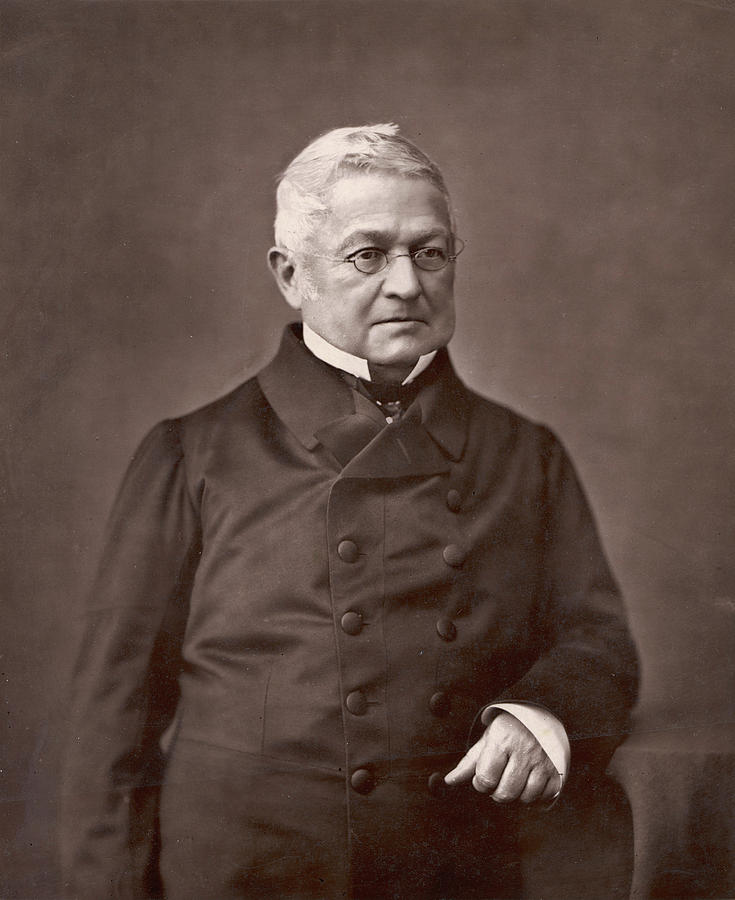
Adolphe Thiers

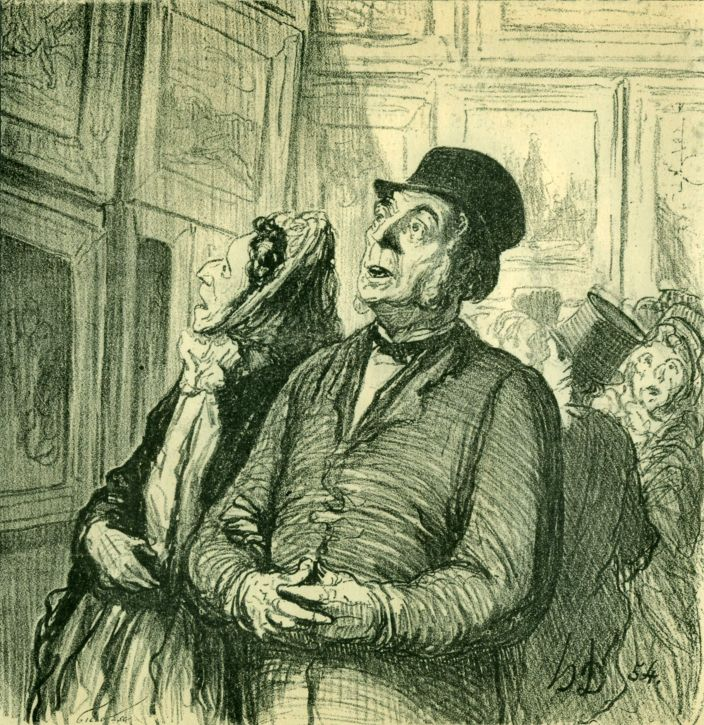
Honoré Daumier: Sunday at the Museum

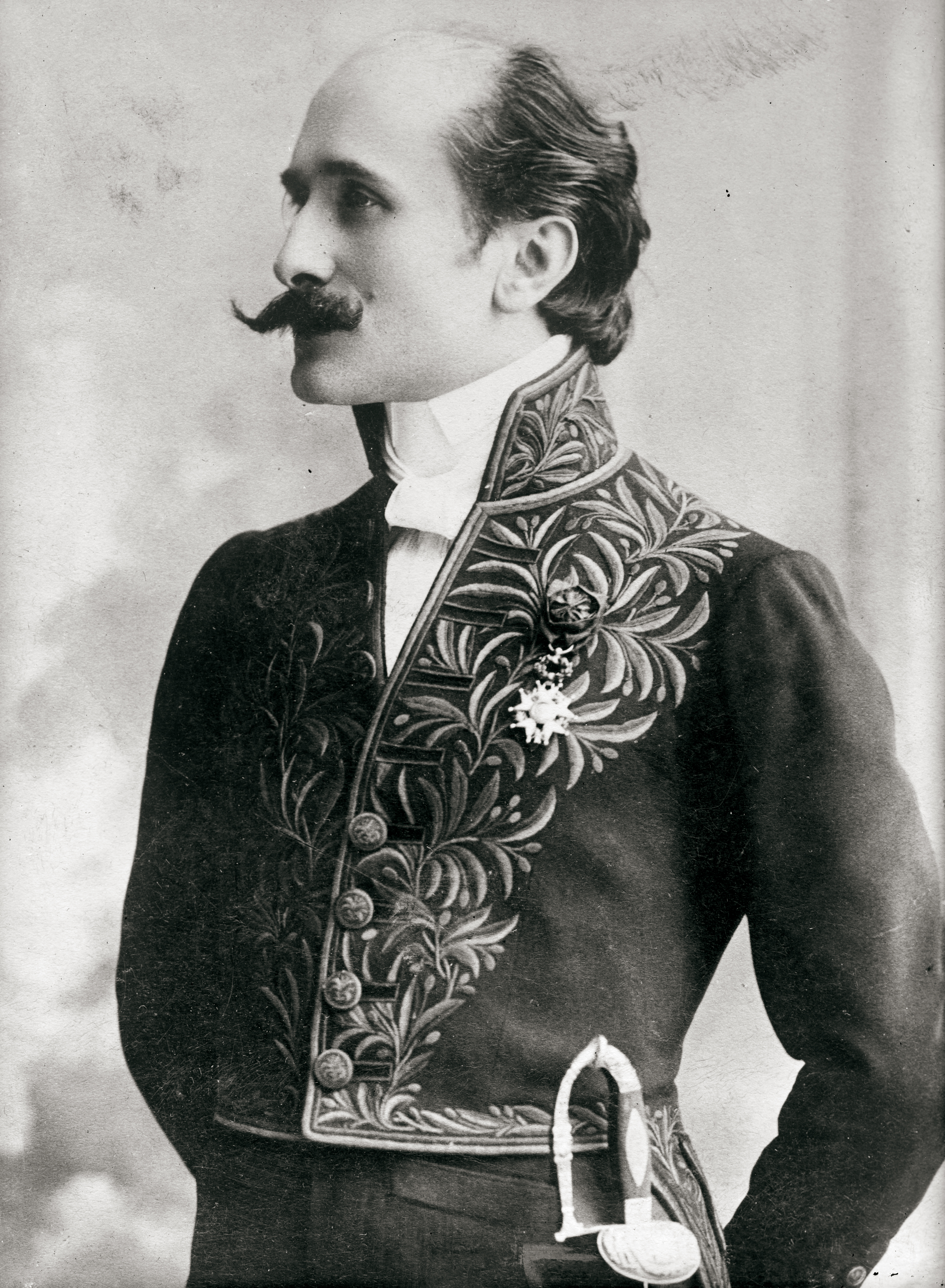
Edmond Rostand

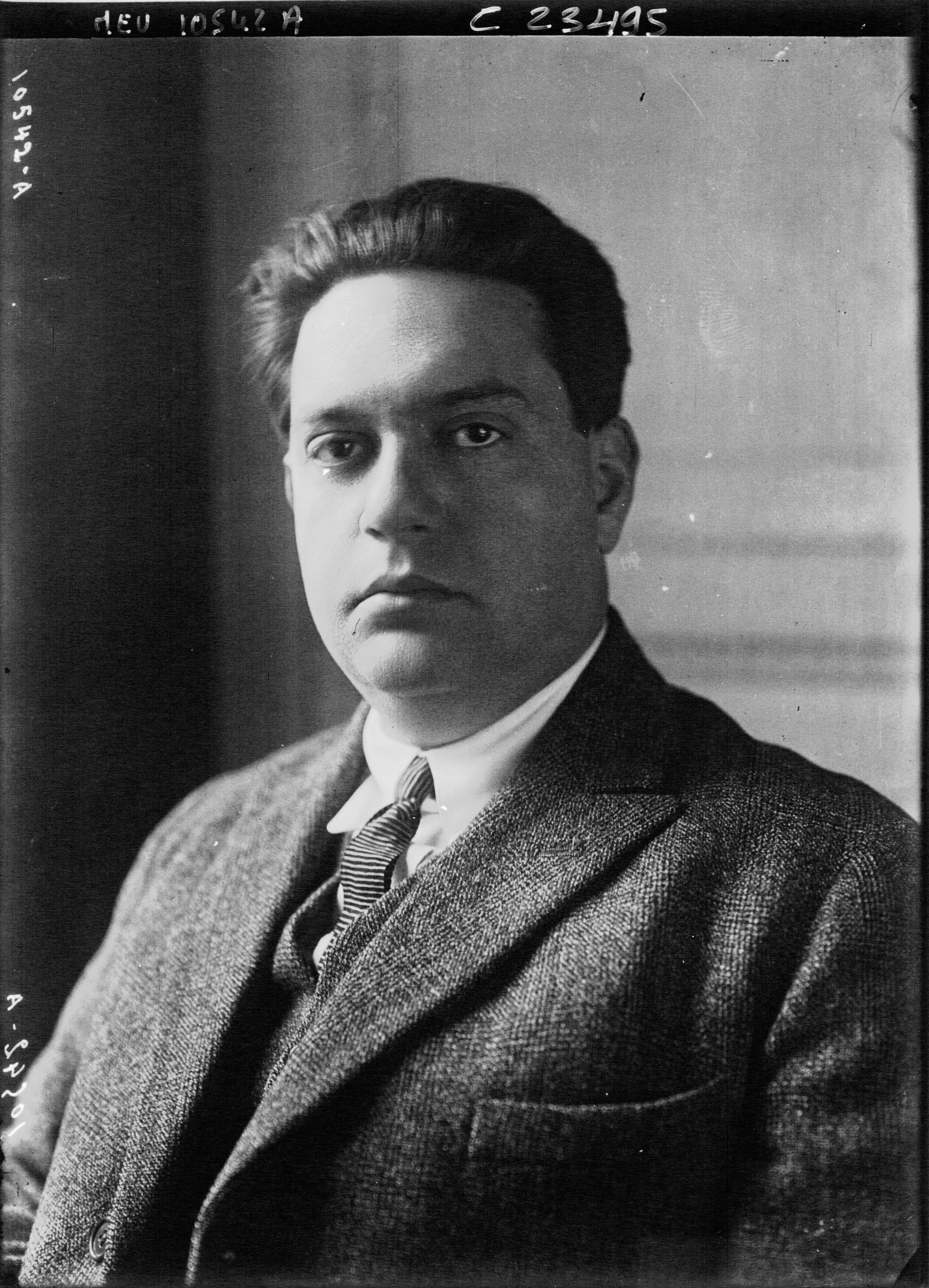
Darius Milhaud

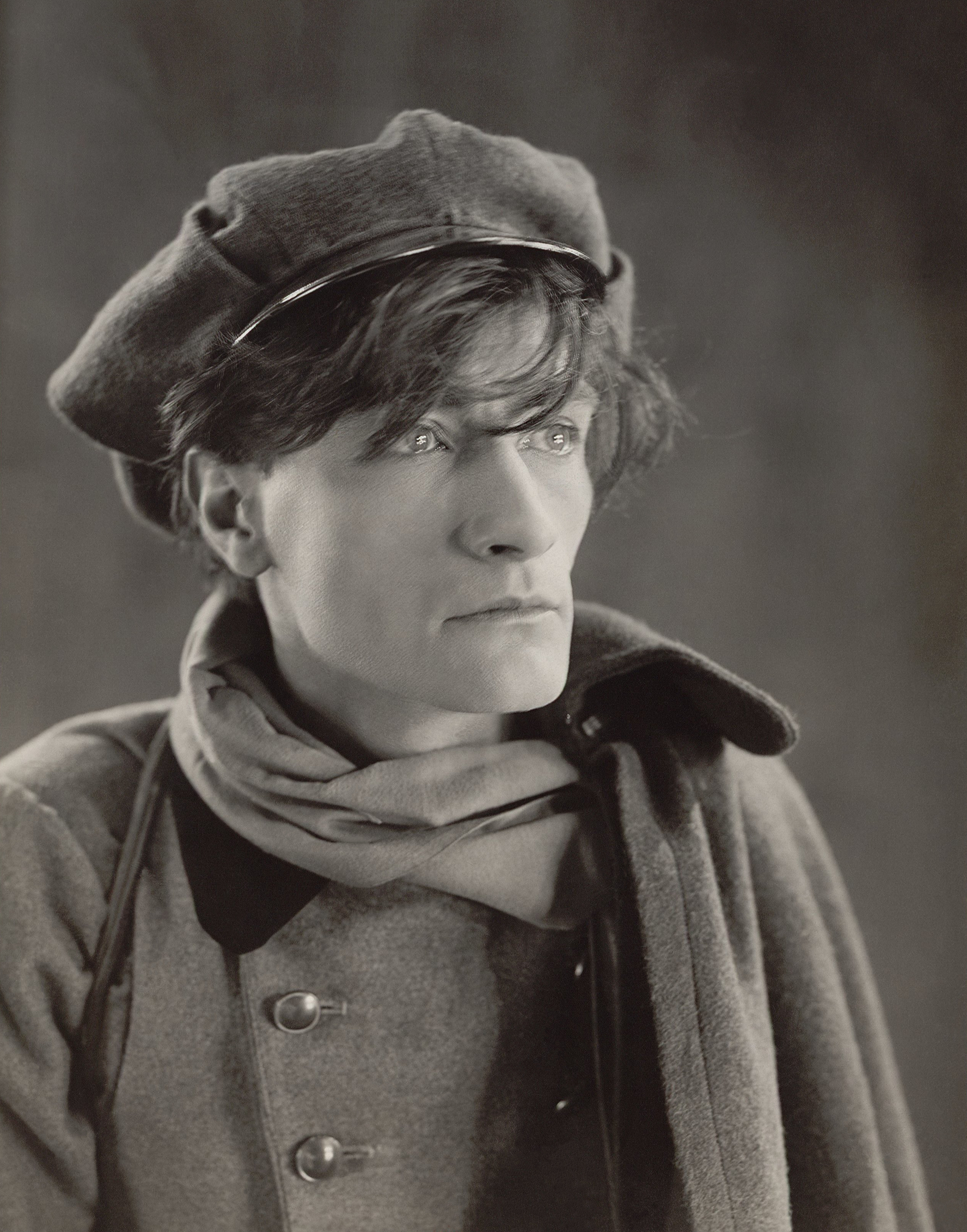
Antonin Artaud

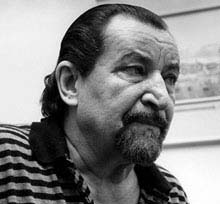
Maurice Béjart

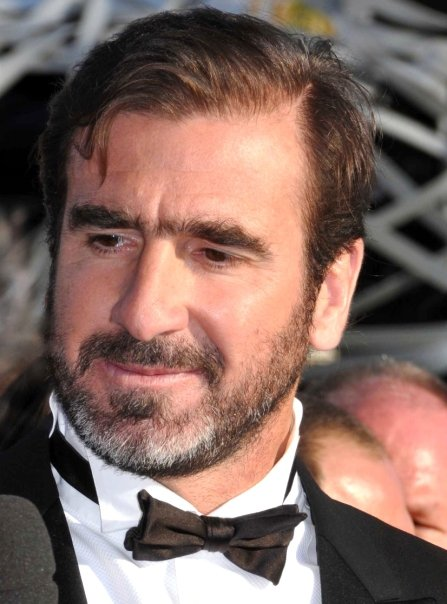
Eric Cantona

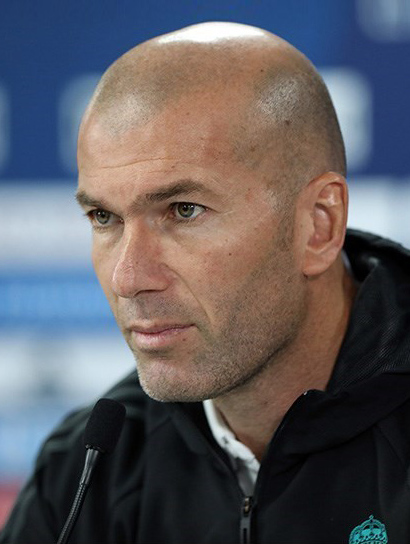
Zinedine Zidane

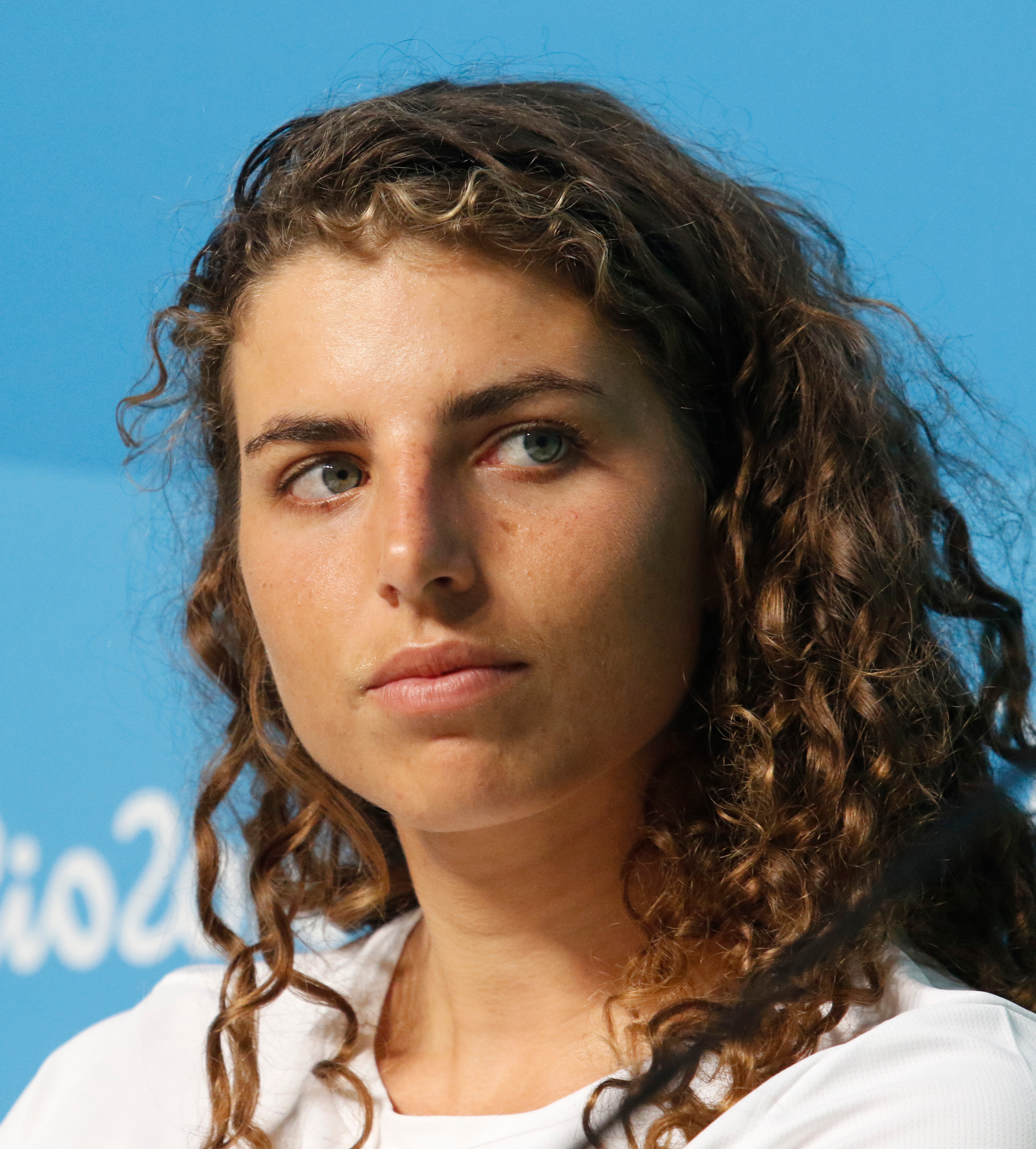
Jessica Fox

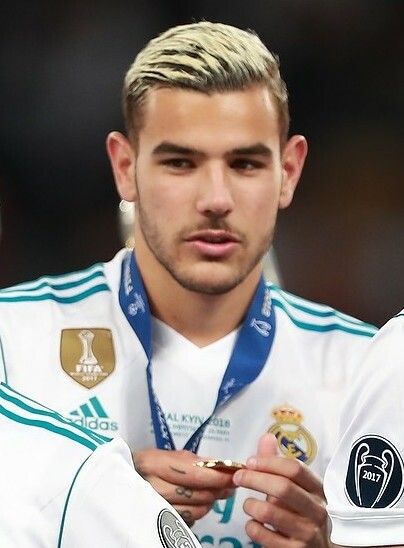
Théo Hernandez

Marseille was the birthplace of:

- Pytheas (fl. fourth century BC), Greek merchant, geographer and explorer
- Petronius (fl. first century AD), Roman novelist and satirist
- Pierre Demours (1702–1795), physician
- Pierre Blancard (1741–1826), introduced the chrysanthemum to France
- Jean-Henri Gourgaud, aka. "Dugazon" (1746–1809), actor
- Jean-Baptiste Benoît Eyriès (1767–1846), geographer, author and translator
- Désirée Clary (1777–1860), wife of King Carl XIV Johan of Sweden, and therefore Queen Desirée or Queen Desideria of Sweden
- Sabin Berthelot (1794–1880), naturalist and ethnologist
- Adolphe Thiers (1797–1877), first president of the Third Republic
- Étienne Joseph Louis Garnier-Pages (1801–1841), politician
- Honoré Daumier (1808–1879), caricaturist and painter
- Joseph Autran (1813–1877), poet
- Charles-Joseph-Eugene de Mazenod (1782–1861), bishop of Marseille and founder of the Missionary Oblates of Mary Immaculate.
- Lucien Petipa (1815–1898), ballet dancer
- Joseph Mascarel (1816–1899), mayor of Los Angeles
- Marius Petipa (1818–1910), ballet dancer and choreographer
- Ernest Reyer (1823–1909), opera composer and music critic
- Olivier Émile Ollivier (1825–1913), statesman
- Jean Baptiste Marie Jaubert (1826–1884) Ornithologist and Physician
- Victor Maurel (1848–1923), operatic baritone
- Ludovic Tézier (1968–), operatic baritone
- Joseph Pujol, aka. "Le Pétomane" (1857–1945), entertainer
- Charles Fabry (1867–1945), physicist
- Edmond Rostand (1868–1918), poet and dramatist
- Pavlos Melas (1870–1904), Greek army officer
- Louis Nattero, (1870–1915), painter
- Vincent Scotto (1876–1952), guitarist, songwriter
- Charles Camoin (1879–1965), fauvist painter
- Henri Fabre (1882–1984), aviator and inventor of the first seaplane
- Frédéric Mariotti (1883–1971), actor
- Darius Milhaud (1892–1974), composer and teacher
- Berty Albrecht (1893–1943), French Resistance, Croix de Guerre
- Antonin Artaud (1897–1948), author
- Henri Tomasi (1901–1971), composer and conductor
- Zino Francescatti (1902–1991), violinist
- Fernandel (1903–1971), actor
- Marie-Madeleine Fourcade (1909–1989), French Resistance, Commander of the Légion d'honneur
- Éliane Browne-Bartroli (Eliane Plewman, 1917–1944), French Resistance, Croix de Guerre
- César Baldaccini (1921–1998), sculptor
- Louis Jourdan (1921–2015), actor
- Jean-Pierre Rampal (1922–2000), flautist
- Alice Colonieu, (1924–2010), ceramist
- Paul Mauriat (1925–2006), orchestra leader, composer
- Maurice Béjart (1927–2007), ballet choreographer
- Régine Crespin (1927–2007), opera singer
- Ginette Garcin (1928–2010), actor
- Jacques Ricard (1929–2018), biophysicist
- André di Fusco (1932–2001), known as André Pascal, songwriter, composer
- Henry de Lumley (born 1934), archaeologist
- Sacha Sosno (1937–2013), sculptor
- La Chunga (born 1938), flamenco dancer and naif artist
- Michel Lazdunski (born 1938), biochemist
- Jean-Pierre Ricard (born 1944), cardinal, archbishop of Bordeaux
- Georges Chappe (born 1944), cyclist
- Jean-Claude Izzo (1945–2000), author
- Denis Ranque (born 1952), businessman
- Ariane Ascaride (born 1954), actress
- Myriam Fox-Jerusalmi (born 1961), world champion slalom canoer
- Eric Cantona (born 1966), Manchester United and France national team football player
- Christophe Galtier (born 1966), football manager and former player
- Patrick Fiori (born 1969), singer
- Marc Panther (born 1970), member of the Japanese rock band Globe
- Zinedine Zidane (born 1972), football player and former captain of the France national football team
- Romain Barnier (born 1976), freestyle swimmer
- Sébastien Grosjean (born 1978), tennis player
- Philippe Echaroux (born 1983), photographer
- Mathieu Flamini (born 1984), football player
- Rémy Di Gregorio (born 1985), cyclist
- Jessica Fox (born 1994), French-born Australian world and Olympic champion slalom canoer
- Lucas Hernandez (born 1996), football player
- Théo Hernandez (born 1997), football player

== International relations ==
=== Twin towns – sister cities ===
Marseille is twinned with 12* cities, all of them being port cities, with the exception of Marrakesh.

- Abidjan, Ivory Coast (est. 1958)
- Antwerp, Belgium (est. 1958)
- Copenhagen, Denmark (est. 1958)
- Dakar, Senegal (est. 1968)
- Genoa, Italy (est. 1958)
- Glasgow, United Kingdom (est. 2006)
- Hamburg, Germany (est. 1958)
- Kobe, Japan (est. 1961)
- Marrakesh, Morocco (est. 2004)
- Naples, Italy (est. 2024)
- Odesa, Ukraine (est. 1972)
- Piraeus, Greece (est. 1984)
- San Diego, United States (est. 2025)
- Shanghai, China (est. 1987)
- Tunis, Tunisia (est. 1989)

=== Partner cities ===
In addition, Marseille has signed various types of formal agreements of cooperation with 24* Cities all over the world:

- Agadir, Morocco (2003)
- Alexandria, Egypt (1991)
- Algiers, Algeria (1980)
- Bamako, Mali (1991)
- Barcelona, Spain (1998)
- Beirut, Lebanon (2003)
- Casablanca, Morocco (1998)
- Istanbul, Turkey (2003)
- Lomé, Togo (1995)
- Lyon, France
- Montevideo, Uruguay (1999)
- Thessaloniki, Greece
- Saint Petersburg, Russia (2013)
- Meknes, Morocco (1998)
- Rabat, Morocco (1989)
- Tirana, Albania (1991)
- Tripoli, Libya (1991)
- Tunis, Tunisia (1998)
- Varna, Bulgaria (2007)
- West Jerusalem, Israel (2006)
- Yerevan, Armenia (1992)

== See also ==
- List of films set in Marseille
- Marcel Pagnol
- Marseille Marine Fire Battalion
- Marseille soap
- Maurice Dubourg (Bishop of Marseille 1928 to 1936)
- Marseille Commune
