= Villa Méditerranée =

Building in Marseille, France

Coordinates: 43°17′50″N 5°21′43″E

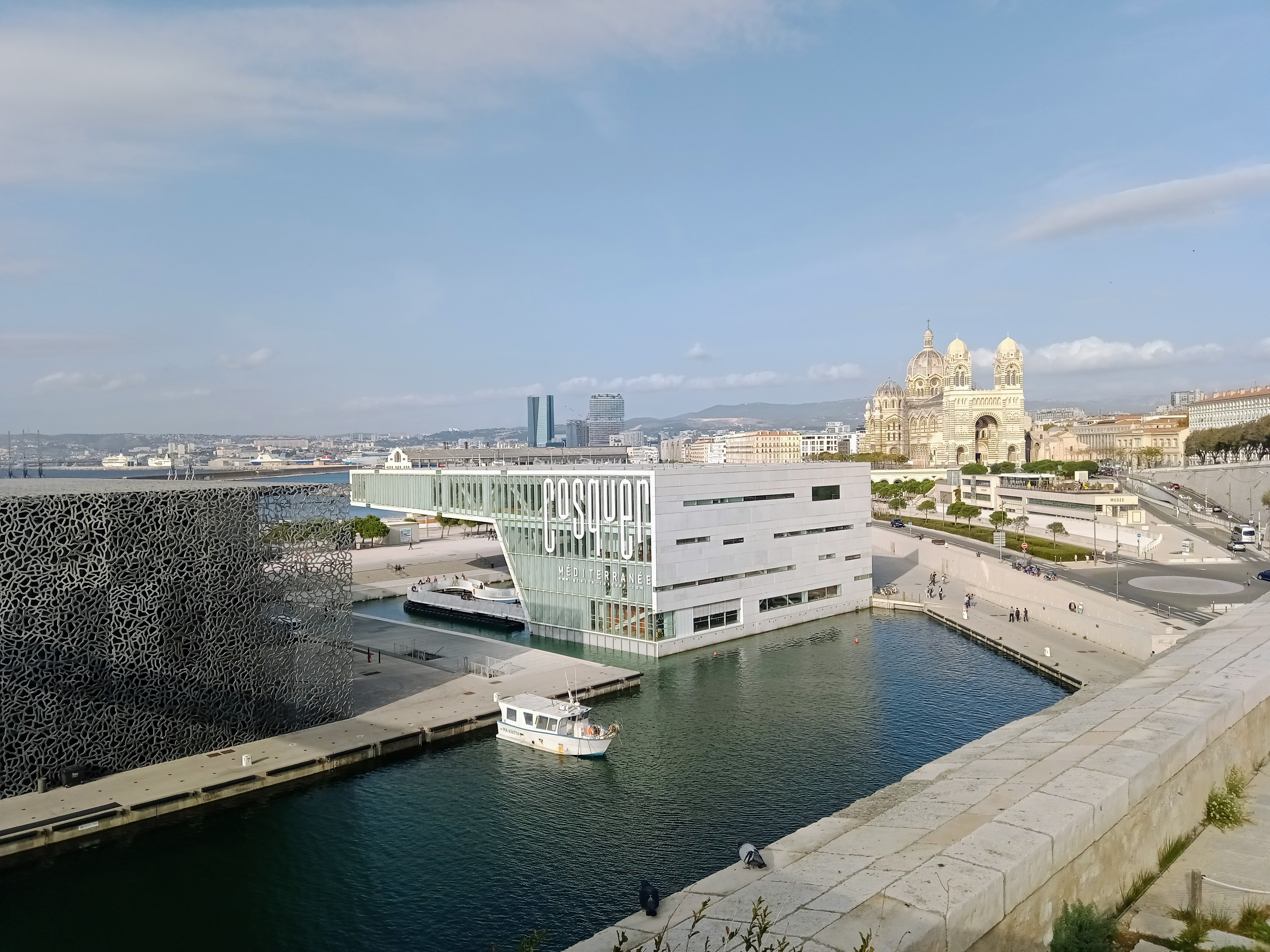
The Villa Méditerranée seen from Fort Saint-Jean with Marseille Cathedral in the background

The Villa Méditerranée (French pronunciation: [vila meditɛʁane]; lit. 'Mediterranean Villa') is a building in the 2nd arrondissement of Marseille, France, designed by Stefano Boeri as part of the Euroméditerranée urban renewal project. It is in the La Joliette neighbourhood just next to the Museum of European and Mediterranean Civilisations (MuCEM) and opened in 2013 initially as a conference centre amid the Marseille-Provence 2013 celebrations. Since 2022 it has housed Cosquer Méditerranée, a museum featuring a replica of the Cosquer Cave.
