= Marseille-Provence 2013 =

2013 program of cultural events in Marseille, France

Marseille-Provence 2013 European Capital of Culture
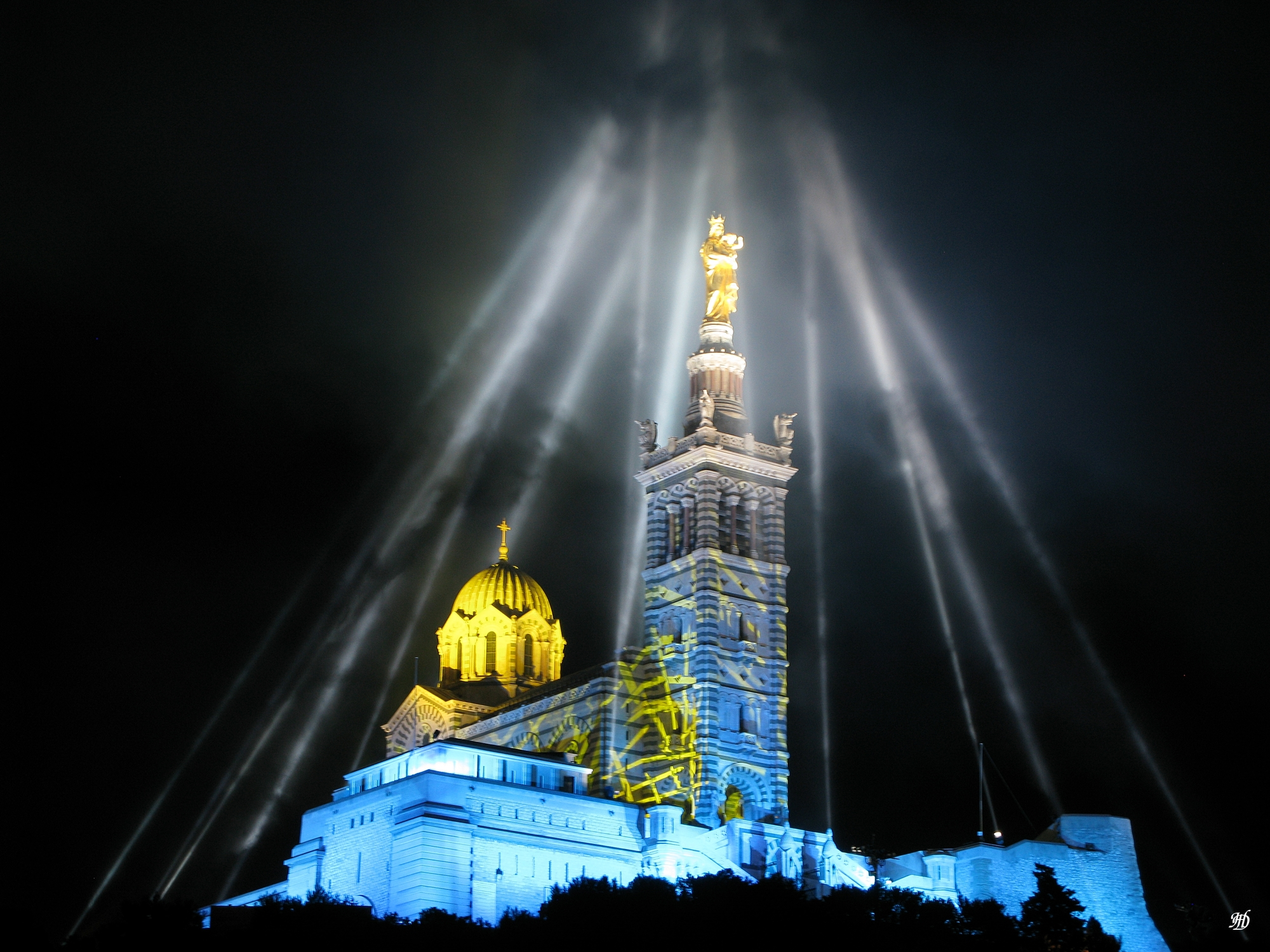
- Notre-Dame de la Garde on opening night
- Date: January 12 to December 31, 2013
- Location: Marseille and Provence
- Organised by: Jacques Pfister, Jean-François Chougnet, Bernard Latarjet
- Website: www.mp2013.fr

Marseille-Provence 2013 or MP2013 was the year-long series of cultural events that took place in Marseille, France, and the surrounding area to celebrate the territory's designation as the European Capital of Culture for 2013. In total, there were more than 900 different cultural events that attracted more 11 million visits.

Marseille-Provence 2013 had an operating budget of approximately 100 million euros and more than 600 million euros in new cultural infrastructure was unveiled in 2013 including the Museum of European and Mediterranean Civilisations (MuCEM) designed by Rudy Ricciotti and the Villa Méditerranée conference center designed by Stefano Boeri. MP2013 was a key part of a larger, decades-long, multibillion-euro development effort to revitalize the city.

== History and organization ==
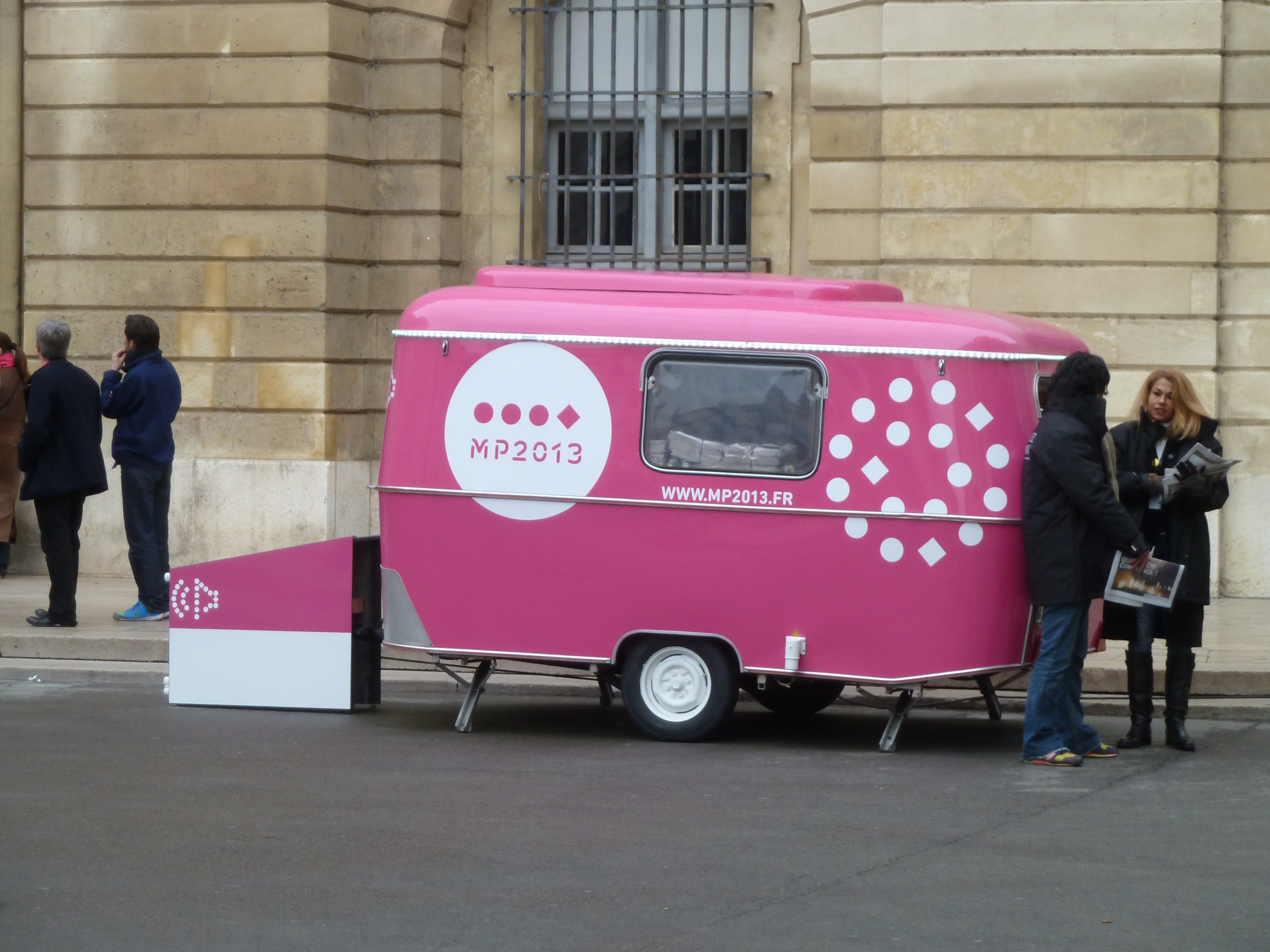
MP2013 information point in Arles

=== History ===
The official designation of European Capital of Culture was created in 1985 with the goal of building ties between citizens of the European Union by celebrating both the diversity of European culture and its common history and values. The event is also considered an opportunity for a city or region raise its international profile and to foster urban renewal through investment in culture and tourism. Thus far, more than 40 cities have received the European Capital of Culture designation.

=== Candidacy ===
The city of Marseille launched its candidacy to host the European Capital of Culture in March 2004 and later expanded their bid to include neighboring cities in Provence. A French jury selected Marseille as its choice in September 2008. In May 2009, the European Council officially announced that Marseille would be the European Capital of Culture in 2013 in parallel with the city of Košice in Slovakia.

=== Marseille-Provence 2013 association ===
In 2006, the official Marseille-Provence 2013 association was created under French laws for non-profit organizations. It brought together members of both the public and private sectors and was first directed by Bernard Latarjet and then Jean-François Chougnet. The association administrative council was led by Jacques Pfister, the president the Chamber of Commerce and Industry for Marseille and Provence.

=== Budget and financing ===
The association had an initial budget of 91 million euros, 84% of which was provided via public financing (the European Union and various levels of French government). The rest of the budget came from the private sector. The final budget for the association was 101 million euros, a sum that included the cost of running the ticket office and other initiatives.

== Territory ==
The territory for the European Capital of Culture Marseille-Provence 2013 included close to 100 communities surrounding Marseille. Among the major communities were:

- Marseille Provence Métropole
- Pays d'Aix
- Agglopole Provence
- Pays d'Aubagne
- Arles
- Pays de Martigues

Other notable jurisdictions included Istres, Gardanne, and Salon-de-Provence.

The community of Toulon withdrew from the project in 2011. The president of the Communauté du Pays d’Aix also threatened to withdraw after the headquarters of the newly formed Aix-Marseille University were placed in Marseille instead of Aix-en-Provence, but she later decided to maintain her community's participation.

== Cultural programme ==
=== Major events ===
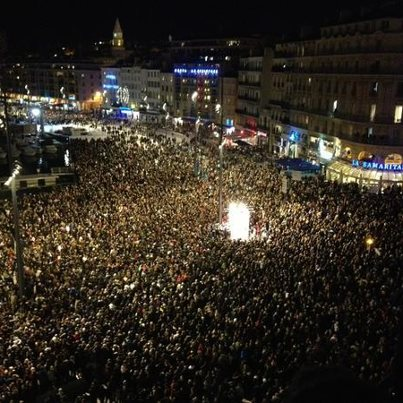
Opening weekend in Marseille

==== Opening weekend ====
The opening ceremony of MP2013 was celebrated January 12 and 13, 2013 in the cities of Marseille, Aix-en-Provence, and Arles. The ceremony was attended by a number of prominent figures including French Prime Minister Jean-Marc Ayrault, European Commission President José Manuel Barros, and French Minister of Culture Aurélie Filipetti. There were various major events including a contemporary art walk in Aix-en-Provence and a pyrotechnical performance by Groupe F on the banks of the Rhône river in Arles. In Marseille, the downtown core was turned over to pedestrians and several performances were held, including the dropping of several tons of feathers as part of the ‘Place of Angels’ performance. The MP2013 association estimated that 600,000 people took part in activities as part of the opening ceremony.

==== Entre Flammes et Flots (Between Flames and Waves) ====
As part of the unveiling of the newly refurbished Vieux Port, the Carabosse company created an artistic installation involving sculptures with thousands of open flames installed across the water and on the quays. The official estimate of the crowd was 400,00 people.

==== TransHumance ====
The tradition of transhumance, or moving vast numbers of livestock from one grazing area to another, was the inspiration for one of the highlights of MP2013. More than 3000 sheep were moved across the MP2013 territory in May and June with a triumphant entry into downtown Marseille on Sunday, June 9. The project was organised by Théâtre du Centaure and was seen by more than 300,000 people.

==== La Nuit industrielle (Industrial Night) ====
As part of an effort to integrate art into non-traditional spaces, MP2013 organised massive installations and projections in the iconic factories and industrial spaces of the cities of Martigues and Port-de-Bouc.

==== Closing ceremony ====
The closing ceremony in Marseille was organised by the pyrotechnics artists Groupe F on the Vieux Port.

=== Major exhibitions ===
Two exhibitions were organised at the newly renovated J1 hangar in the heart of the port of Marseille. The first examined the history of the Mediterranean people and their relationship with the sea and their cities, the second looked at the architect Le Corbusier, his ties to Marseille and his role in the Brutalist architecture movement. The J1 hangar was opened to the public exclusively for the year of the European Capital of Culture.

Another prime exhibition was the Grand Atelier du Midi that was organised at the Musée des beaux-arts de Marseille and the Musée Granet in Aix-en-Provence and featured iconic paintings of Provence by Paul Cézanne, Vincent van Gogh, Pierre Bonnard, and many others. It generated 460,000 visits.

The city of Aubagne also hosted two major exhibitions, one featuring the ceramic work of Picasso, the other a mobile exhibition of work from the Centre Pompidou.

The Camp des Milles, a World War II internment site near the city of Aix, was renovated and opened as a cultural and memorial site for MP2013. It featured a notable exhibition of work by the artists and writers who had been detained at the camp during the war.

=== GR 2013 ===
A new hiking trail that was opened to coincide withMP2013: the GR2013 is a 365 km trail around the Marseille area that unites countryside and cities, natural green spaces and industrial sites, a metropolis and the seaside cliffs. This project was the result of the collaboration between the 38 jurisdictions that the GR passes through, the departmental government, the French national hiking association Fédération française de Randonnée pédestre, the regional hiking associations, and Bouches-du-Rhône Tourisme.

=== Quartiers Créatif (Creative Urban Projects) ===
This was a participative project that placed artists in developing urban areas to produce events or create art with local residents. The programme was run with both government and social services groups.

This programme was criticised because, despite large investments, the events had low visibility and were held irregularly so they didn't create any lasting cultural dynamic.

Resident associations also denounced the project for being promotional tool for urban development programmes that were actually rejected by many locals and the source of political conflict. There was also concern that cultural groups that were already involved in these neighbourhoods were asked to participate in the programme.

=== The Off ===
For the first time in the history of the European Capital of Culture, there was also an Off festival. It was organised by the association M2K13. This group actually foresaw the EEC and bought the domain name "marseille2013.com" and registered the trademark "Marseille 2013" in early 2004, prior to the official candidacy being launched. The group initially hoped help integrate local artists into the official programme and collected more than 150 proposals for projects.

However, in 2009, the official MP2013 association decided not to collaborate with M2K13 so this group created the Off festival. It was able to raise 465,000 euros in fund, with 65% coming from the private sector, notably the Banque populaire provençale et corse. Among the notable projects featured in the Off was Yes We Camp, an urban campsite in the northern part of Marseille, and the Klaxon series of exhibitions.

Certain artist groups accused the Off of becoming institutionalised, which then led to the Alter Off being organised. This group embraced an idea of egalitarianism and accepted every project that was proposed.

== Infrastructure ==
=== Pavillon M ===
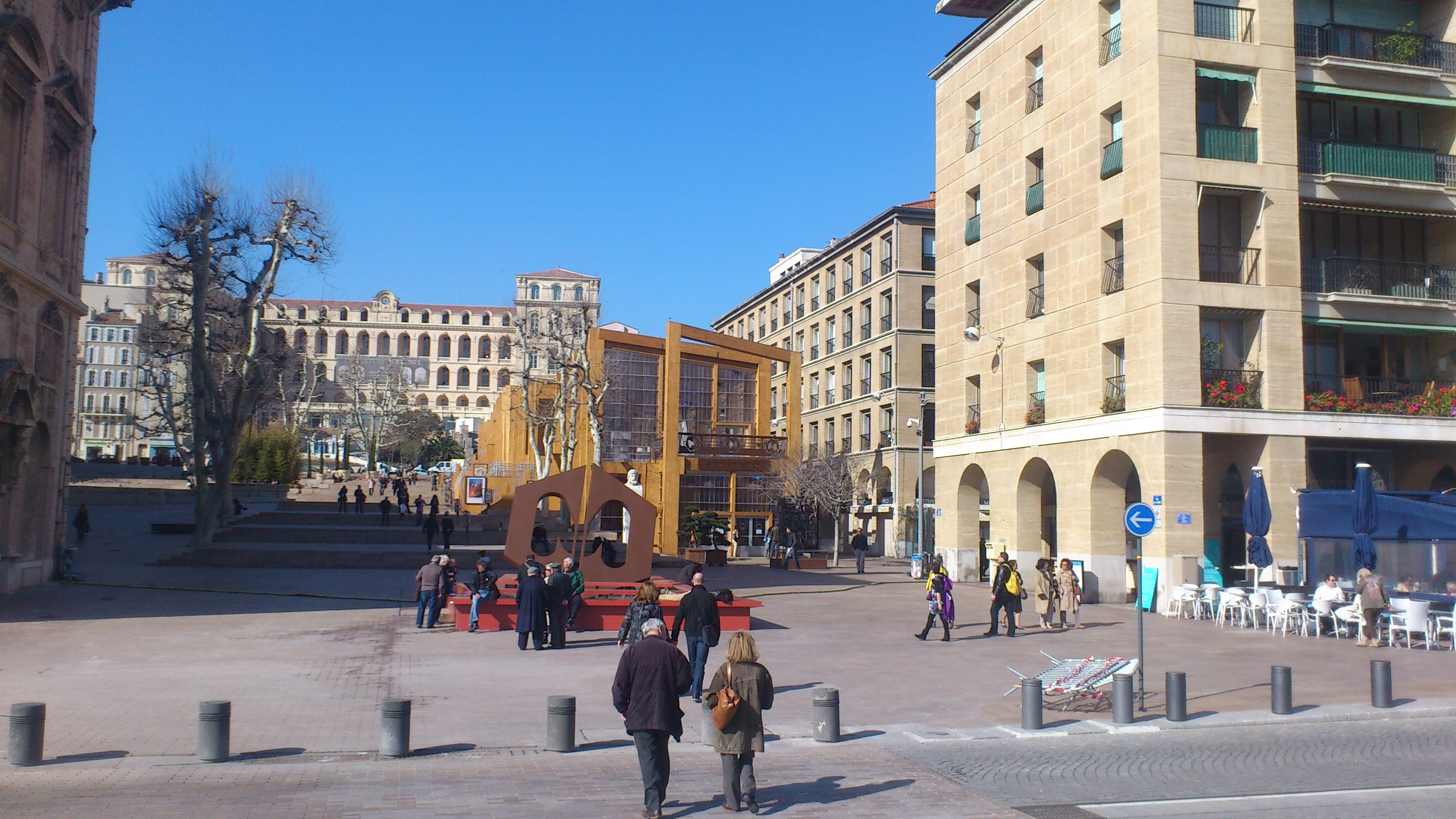
Pavillon M

This temporary site was built on Place Villeneuve-Bargemon next to the mayor's office and served as the official welcome centre for MP2013. The building included 3,000 m^{2} of renovated space and 1,200 m^{2} of temporary space. It cost €5 million and was not initially part of the MP2013 budget. It closed on 31 December 2013 and the temporary structure was dismantled.

=== MuCEM (Musée des Civilisations de l'Europe et de la Méditerranée) ===
The Museum of European and Mediterranean Civilisations (MuCEM) was the first national museum opened outside of the Paris region. The museum was built on the J4 quay beside Fort Saint-Jean overlooking the Mediterranean. It was designed by the architect Rudy Ricciotti. The museum is now home to the collection of the Musée national des Arts et Traditions Populaires that was closed in 2005. The museum opened on June 7, 2013 and received more than 1.9 million visitors in the first eight months.

=== J1 ===
The J1 hangar is situated along the port's waterfront near the place de la Joliette. It was renovated for 2013 with designs by the architects Catherine Bonte and Michael Muntéanu. It hosted two exhibitions associated with MP2013 but its future is uncertain.

=== Darius Milhaud Conservatory ===
Designed by the Japanese architect Kengo Kuma, the conservatory was built to welcome world-class musicians and the best music students to the south of France. It opened in September 2013.

=== Musée Regards de Provence ===
The Fondation Regards de Provence created a new museum, the Musée Regards de Provence, in the former Station sanitaire located beside the La Major cathedral on the port of Marseille. This project represented the single largest private investment in MP203. It opened in February 2013.

=== Villa Méditerranée ===
Also located on the J4 quay, not far from the MuCEM, the Villa Méditerranée is "an international centre for Mediterranean dialogue and exchange" that was created by the regional government of Provence-Alpes-Côtes d'Azur. The building was designed by Stefano Boeri in the shape of an inverse "L" with a prominent overhang over a pool of water.

=== Fonds régional d'art contemporain (Regional Contemporary Art Fund) ===
The building for the Fonds régional d'art contemporain (FRAC) was designed by the architect Kengo Kuma and is part of the new Joliette business quarter. It opened in March 2013.

== Renovations or extensions ==
=== La Friche de la Belle de Mai ===
La Friche is a massive cultural complex located in an old tobacco factory. It opened in 1992 but was expanded in 2013 with the notable addition of the Tour Panorama dedicated to contemporary arts.

=== Musée d'histoire de Marseille ===
Opened in 1993, the Musée d’histoire de Marseille is located in the Belsunce neighbourhood beside the Jardin des Vestiges, the ruins of the original Greek port. The museum was renovated for MP2013 and re-opened in September 2013. It features the largest collection of ancient ships in the world.

=== Musée des Arts décoratifs ===
The 18th century estate Château Borély was transformed into a museum to house the collections of the former fashion museum and pottery, china, and ceramics museum. It opened in June 2013.

=== Renovation of the Vieux-Port ===
The Vieux-Port in Marseille was entirely transformed to become one of the largest public spaces in Europe with a complete reorganisation of the automobile traffic along its perimeter and the removal of barriers that impeded direct access to the sea. It also features a closed pergola with a mirrored ceiling that was designed by the architect Norman Foster.

== Reactions ==
The Marseille area had long been plagued by a negative reputation, epitomized by the film The French Connection about the heroin trade in Marseille in the 1970s and continued into the 21st century by a series of high-profile crimes and a penchant for "Marseille-bashing" in the Paris-based media. MP2013 was seen as an opportunity to shine the spotlight on the new Marseille and rejuvenate its international image.

=== Tourism ===
The European Capital of Culture was a popular success with more than 10 million visits recorded for the various events. It also generated a considerable surge in tourism with the Chamber of Commerce and Industry for Marseille and Provence reporting that there were almost 2 million additional visitors in 2013, roughly half of them tourists and the other half excursionists or day-trippers.

=== Economic effects ===
The Chamber of Commerce and Industry for Marseille and Provence determined that the additional tourism and extra spending related to MP2013 generated roughly 500 million euros in economic benefits. They also concluded that in the tourism sector, MP2013 was responsible for generating 2 800 jobs (full-time equivalencies) in 2013.

=== Media ===
MP2013 also led to international media recognition and greatly improved the image of the city of Marseille. The New York Times cited Marseille as number two on the places to visit in 2013 after Rio. Marseille also won the award for Best City in 2014 from Wallpaper magazine (along with San Francisco).

=== Other ===
Marseille was named ‘European City of the Year 2014’ by The Academy of Urbanism in London, a professional association of more than 500 British designers.

== Controversies ==
=== Albert Camus exhibition ===
An exhibition based on the Albert Camus archives was supposed to be organised in Aix-en-Provence by the sociologist and historian Benjamin Stora. However, Stora was removed from the project which led the French Ministry of Culture to withdraw its financing. The exhibition was then put in the hands of Michel Onfray, but he later decided to leave the project. The exhibition was finally removed from the official MP2013 programme and a smaller version was organised at the Cité du Livre in Aix-en-Provence.

=== Involvement of residents ===
One of the goals of MP2013 was to integrate art into public spaces and to involve people who weren't traditionally attending cultural events. One of the main projects to bring culture to disadvantaged neighbourhoods was Quartiers creatifs, but this programme faced strong criticism among many residents who felt the cultural development was part of a gentrification plan. The Marseille rapper Keny Arkana wrote a song Capitale de la rupture that denounced the European Capital of Culture for pushing traditional residents to the side and trying to make Marseille just another "nice city on the Côte d’Azur".

The sociologist Sylvia Girel also published a report noting that many people weren't involved in MP2013, notably those in the poorer northern neighbourhoods of Marseille or the rural regions of Provence.

=== David Guetta concert ===
In February 2013, the news website Marsactu revealed that the City of Marseille was providing a 400 000 euro subsidy for a concert at Parc Borély in Marseille by the internationally renowned DJ David Guetta. This subsidy for an internationally successful artist who was already charging high ticket prices was seen as proof that MP2013 was promoting established international artists as opposed to investing in local culture. The Parc Borély concert was cancelled and David Guetta played a non-subsidized concert instead.

=== Absence of rap ===
Marseille is known for its vibrant rap scene so there was massive criticism of MP2013 for not including more local rap artists in its official programme. Among others, the Marseille rapper Akhenaton publicly denounced the lack of rap programming. In May 2012, the European committee overseeing the European Capital of Culture programme observed that MP2013 seemed to have an over-representation of ‘high culture’.
