= Museum of European and Mediterranean Civilisations =

- Musée des Civilisations de l'Europe et de la Méditerranée
- Mucem logo

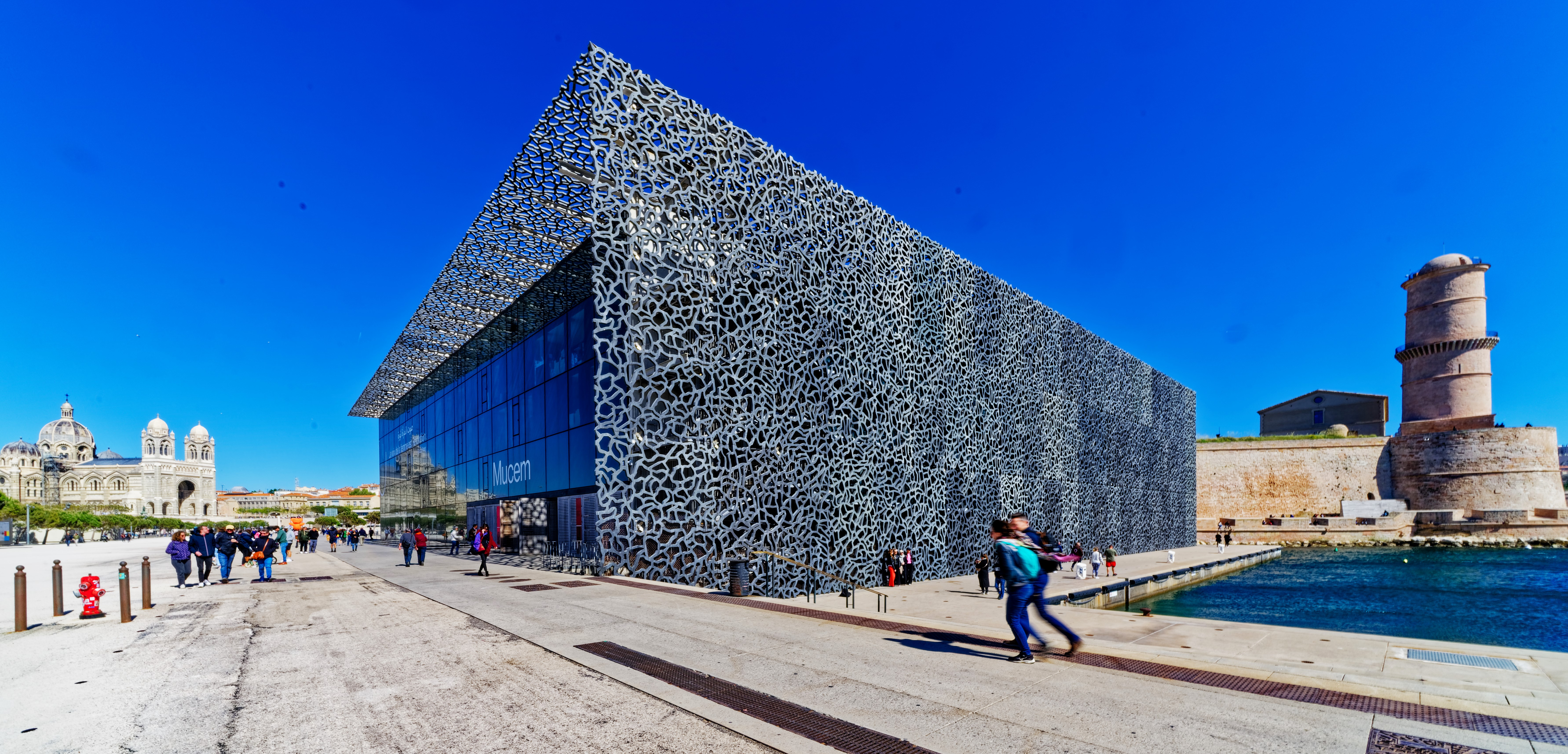
- Exterior of the Mucem

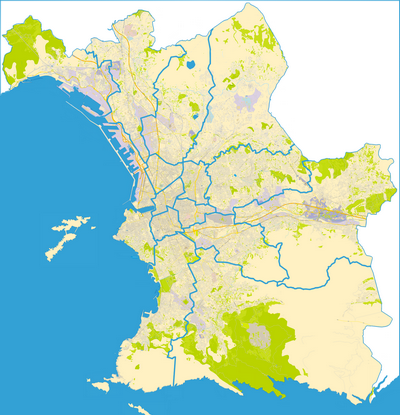
- Location in Marseille Museum of European and Mediterranean Civilisations (France)
- Established: 1 June 2013; 13 years ago
- Location: Marseille, France
- Coordinates: 43.295278°N 5.361944°E
- Type: National museum of ethnology
- President: Jean-François Chougnet
- Architects: Rudy Ricciotti and Roland Carta
- Owner: Government of France
- Website: mucem.org

The Museum of European and Mediterranean Civilisations (Mucem or MuCEM; French: Musée des Civilisations de l'Europe et de la Méditerranée; Occitan: Museu de las Civilizacions Europèas e Mediterranèas) is an ethnology national museum in Marseille, France. It was built as part of the Euroméditerranée urban renewal project along with the neighbouring Villa Méditerranée in the La Joliette neighbourhood in the 2nd arrondissement opposite Fort Saint-Jean.

It was inaugurated in 2013 by President François Hollande as part of Marseille-Provence 2013, a year when Marseille was designated as the European Capital of Culture. In 2015, it won the Council of Europe Museum Prize. Between 2013 and 2016, the Mucem welcomed 8.5 million visitors, including 2.2 million in its exhibition spaces. The museum is therefore presented as a tool for the cultural attractiveness of the Aix-Marseille-Provence Metropolis.

== Overview ==
The museum is devoted to European and Mediterranean civilisations. With a permanent collection charting historical and cultural cross-fertilisation in the Mediterranean basin, it takes an interdisciplinary approach to society through the ages up to modern times.

The museum is built on reclaimed land at the entrance to the harbour, next to the site of the 17th-century Fort Saint-Jean and a former port terminal called the J4. A channel separates the new building and the Fort Saint-Jean, which has been restructured as part of the project. The two sites are linked by a high footbridge, 130 m (430 ft) long. Another footbridge links the Fort Saint-Jean to the Esplanade de la Tourette, near the church of St Laurent in the Panier quarter.

The museum, built "of stone, water and wind", was designed by the architect Rudy Ricciotti in collaboration with the architect Roland Carta. A cube of 15,000 square metres (160,000 sq ft) surrounded by a latticework shell of fibre-reinforced concrete, it houses exhibits on two levels, with an underground auditorium seating 400. The permanent collection and bookshop are situated on the ground floor. There is a restaurant on the terrace at the top of the building with panoramic views of the bay of Marseille, the Corniche and the Prado.

The exhibition devoted in 2022 to the Emir Abdelkader makes it possible to address, for example, issues of history and memory of a great figure in the Mediterranean.

== Galerie ==
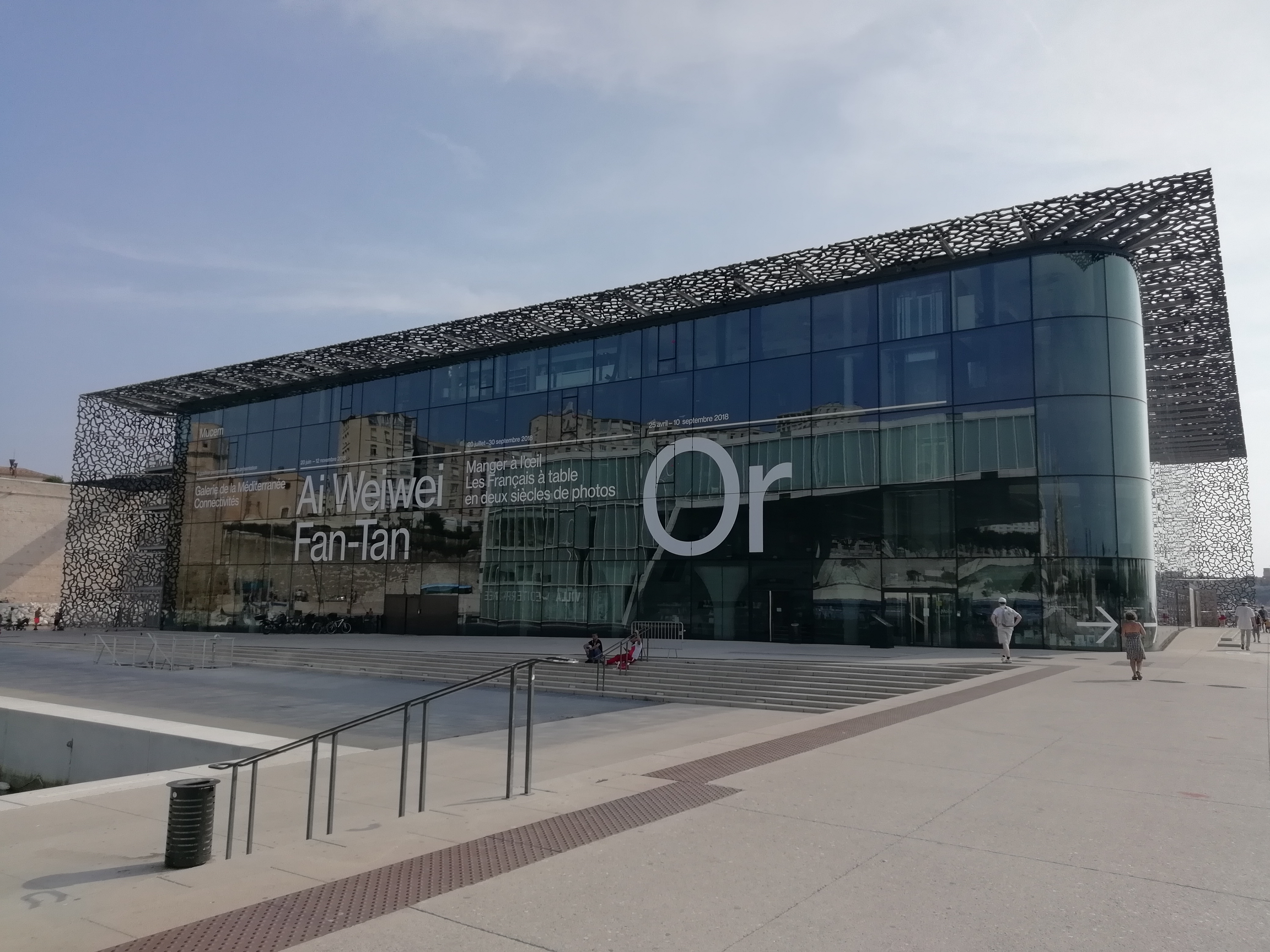

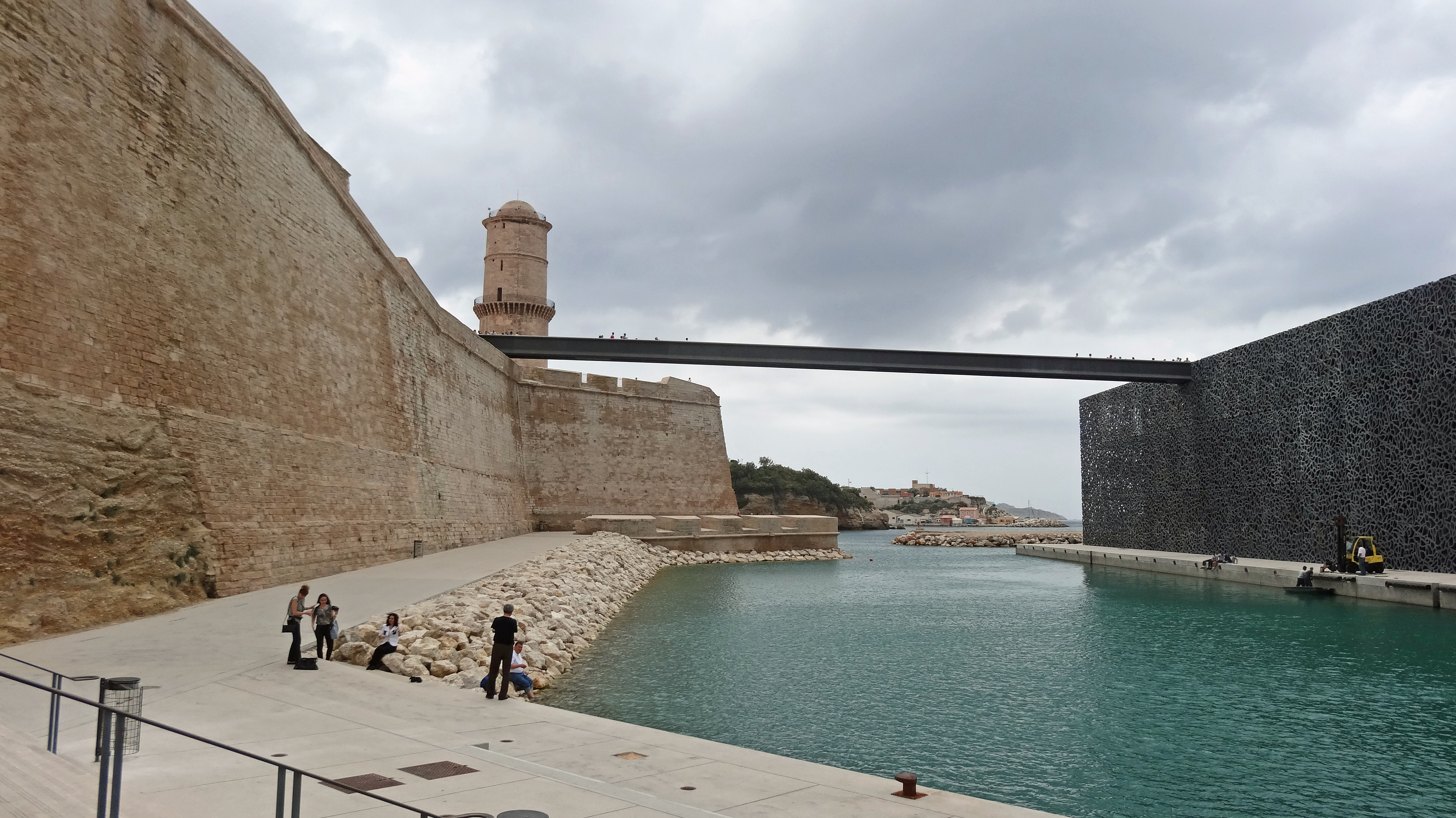

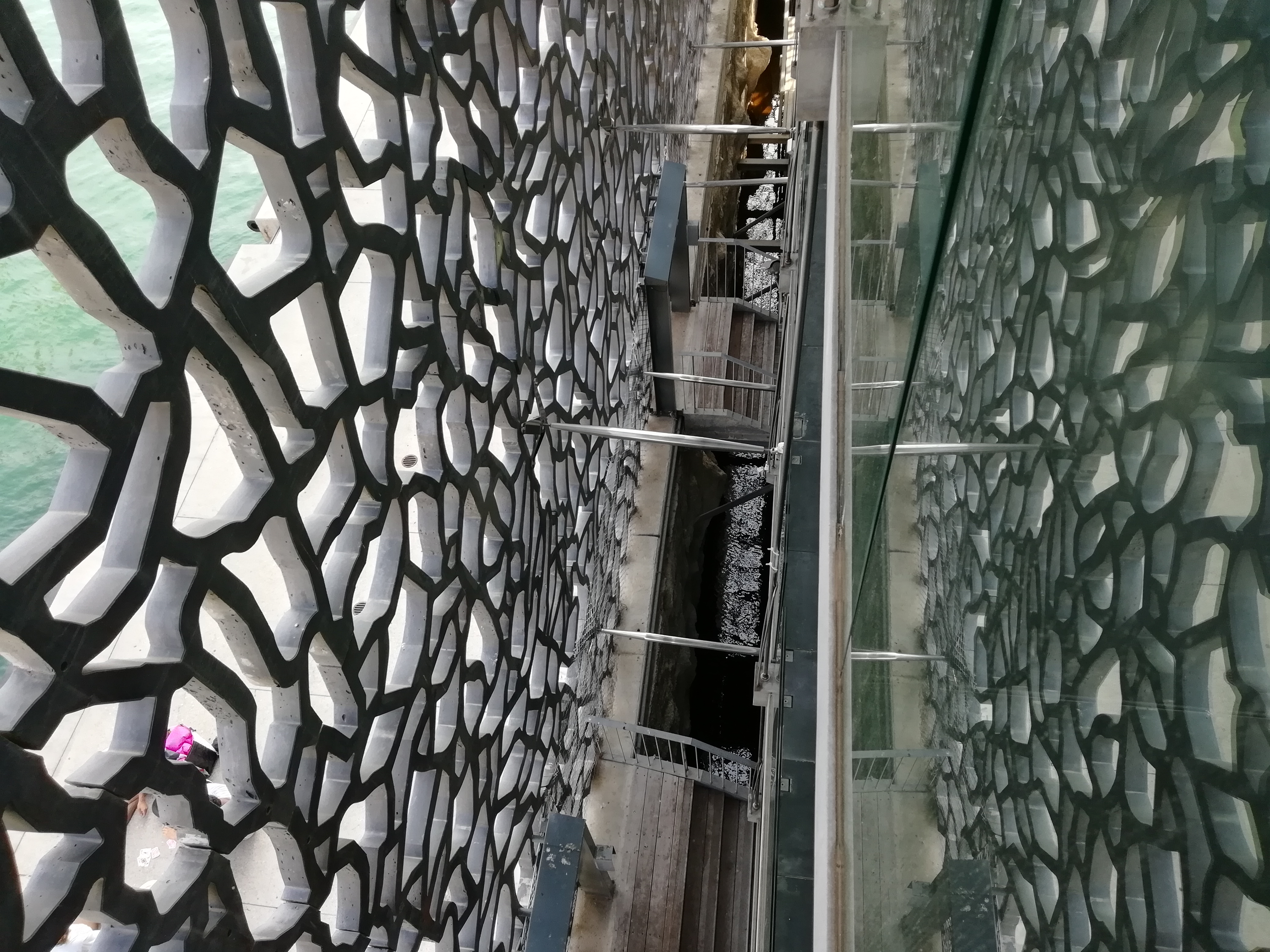

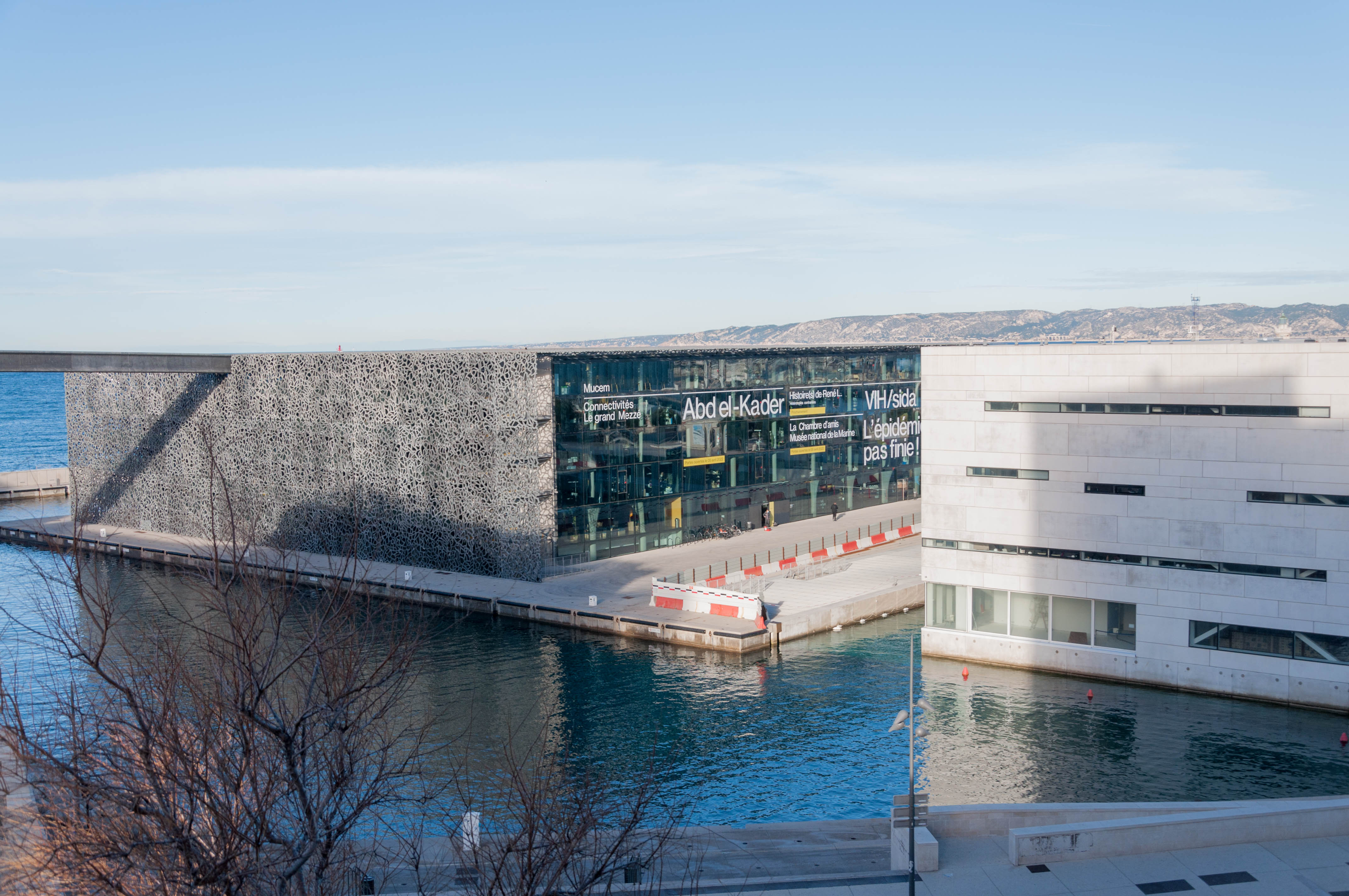

== See also ==
- Musée national des Arts et Traditions Populaires (France)
- Luigi Monzo: Marseille Beyond the Icon: MuCEM and the Mediterranean Metropolis. https://luigimonzo.com/2025/07/05/marseille-beyond-the-icon-mucem-and-the-mediterranean-metropolis/
