= Place Villeneuve-Bargemon =

Public square in Marseille, France

Coordinates: 43°17′48″N 5°22′13″E

Place Villeneuve-Bargemon with the Hôtel-Dieu in the background

Place Villeneuve-Bargemon (French pronunciation: [plas vilnœv baʁʒəmɔ̃]; lit. 'Villeneuve-Bargemon Square') or Place Bargemon is a public square in the 2nd arrondissement of Marseille, France. It is the site of former Roman thermae.

It links the Hôtel de Ville on the Vieux-Port with the Hôtel-Dieu through a series of steps. It is known for its views on Notre-Dame de la Garde across the Vieux-Port.
