= Musée Regards de Provence =

Art museum in Marseille, France

Coordinates: 43°17′52″N 5°21′49″E

The Musée Regards de Provence with Marseille Cathedral in the background

The Musée Regards de Provence (French: [myze ʁəɡaʁ d(ə) pʁɔvɑ̃s]) is an art museum in Marseille, France. It was opened in 2013 by the Fondation Regards de Provence in the former Station sanitaire du Port de Marseille in the 2nd arrondissement amid the Marseille-Provence 2013 celebrations. It has a collection of over 850 art pieces related to Southern France, the Mediterranean coast and Provence.
