= Metropolitan Trails =

Hiking trails

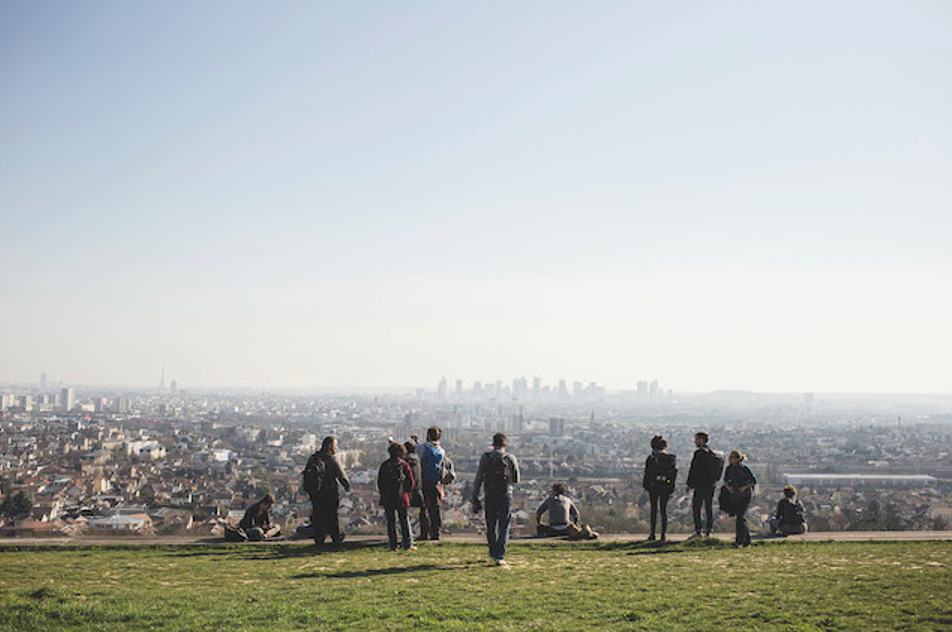
Orgemont hills, Greater Paris metropolitan trail

Metropolitan Trails are urban and suburban hiking trails. As defined by French NGO Sentiers Métropolitains, they encourage walkers to discover a metropolitan territory, in several days of hiking.

Conceived as a new space of creation at the crossroads of development, art, tourism, and ecology, a metropolitan trail is a cultural equipment that changes the ways of living and apprehending the territory.

== Origins ==
The first official metropolitan trail was the GR2013, a 350-kilometre-long (220 mi) GR footpath around Marseille, launched for Marseille-Provence 2013 European event.

== Development ==
Besides GR2013, other metropolitan trails have been designed; like "Inspiral London", "Iki Deniz Arası” ("Between Two Seas") in Istanbul, "Parcours Métropolitain du Grand Lyon", "Sentier de Randonnée Périurbaine" in Bordeaux, or "Sentieri Metropolitani Milano".

== Organization ==
Marseille-based not-for-profit organization Sentiers Métropolitains is in charge of the coordination of many trails, including Marseilles, Paris and Avignon. As explained on their website, the design of metropolitan trails takes its roots in hiking, culture, urbanism and art.

== Contemporary art ==
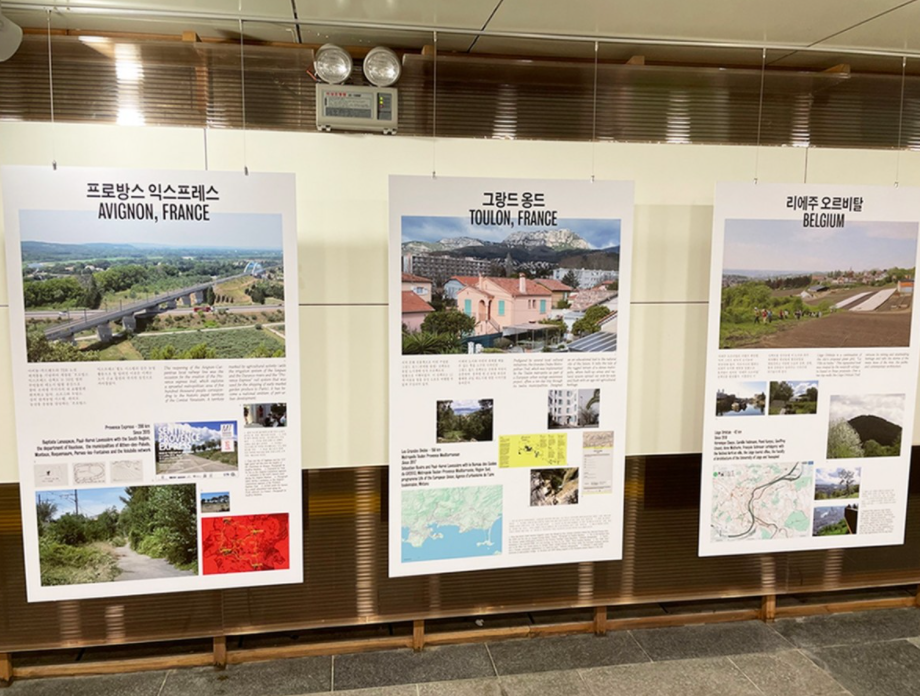
Metropolitan trail exhibition in Seoul, September 2021

One of the peculiarities of metropolitan paths compared to the classical hiking trails is the transversal link they maintain with the world of contemporary art, urban planning, tourism and ecology. The GR2013 was drawn by eleven artists-walkers from Marseille, including the urban planner Nicolas Mémain. He received the 2013 Urban Planning Award from the Academy of Architecture for the creation of the GR2013 metropolitan trail. By offering to survey urban or peri-urban territories, the metropolitan trail crosses contrasting landscapes (highways, rivers, hills, industrial, commercial, and natural areas...) and invites the walker to build a more intimate relationship with territories and to walk where we don't usually hike.

Both urban and cultural projects, metropolitan trails are designed in several dimensions: collective explorations to develop them (landmarks, public marches, metropolitan hikes), shared stories that document them (artistic projects, books, articles, travel stories, sound shows, documentary films, exhibitions) and a shared itinerary developed in collaboration with the territories.

The exhibition "L'art des sentiers métropolitains" at the Pavillon de l'Arsenal from July to October 2020, which invited visitors to discover this emerging urban art has since been travelling in several cities, such as Strasbourg, Caen, or even Seoul.

== List of metropolitan trails ==
Europe

- (England) InspiralLondon
- (France) GR2013, arounds Marseilles
- (France) Greater Paris metropolitan trail
- (France) Bordeaux metropolitan trail
- (France) Provence Express trail, arounds Avignon
- (France) Toulon metropolitan trail
- (Italy) Sentieri Metropolitani, Milan
- (Greece) Attico Monopati, Greater Athens / Attic
- (Turkey) Between two seas (Iki Deniz Arasi), Istanbul
- (Belgium) Liège Orbitale, Liège

Africa

- (Tunisia) Tunis Houmani trail

America

- (United States) Boston Metropolitan trail
