= InterContinental Marseille Hôtel-Dieu =

InterContinental Marseille – Hôtel-Dieu
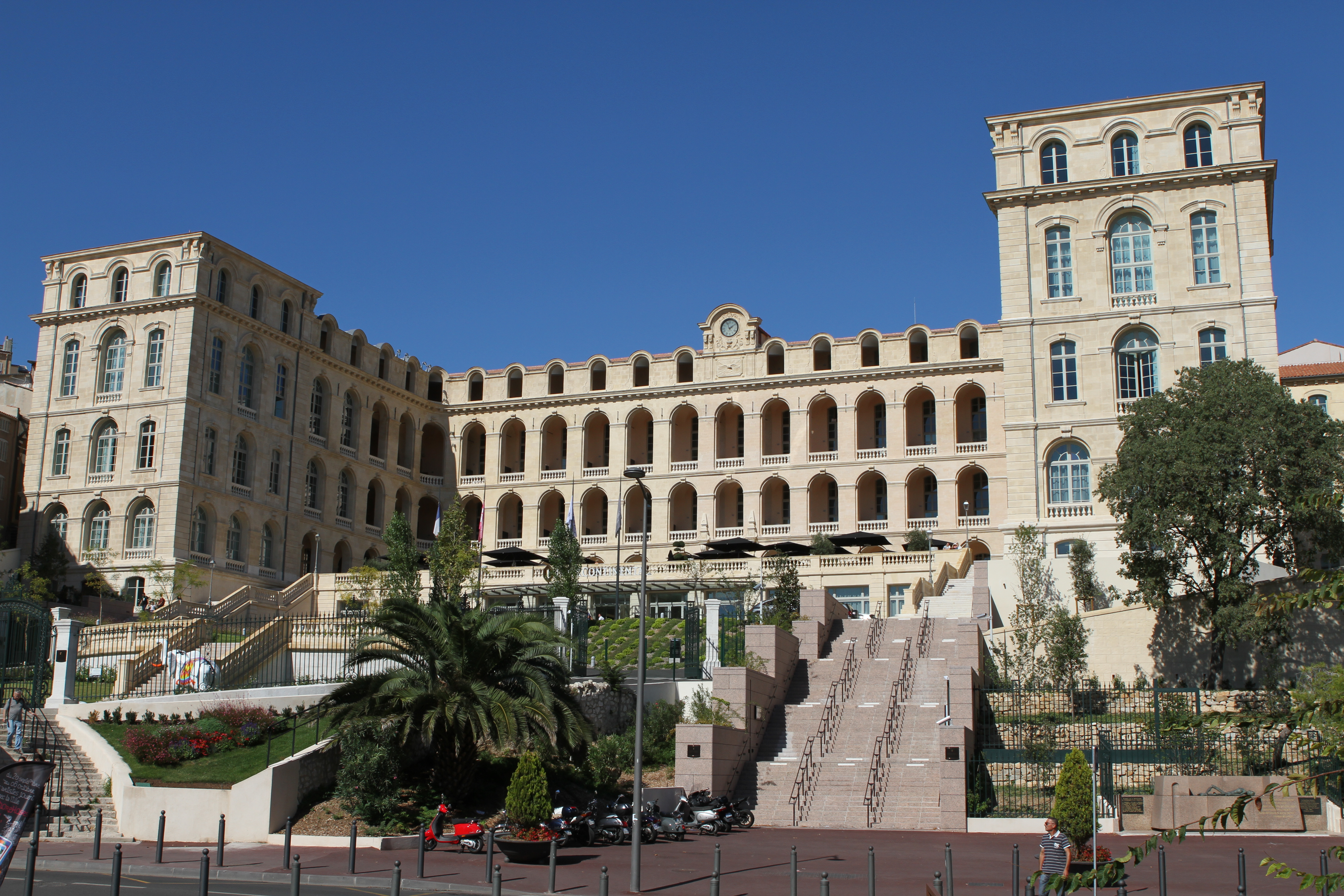
- Façade of the InterContinental hotel
- Former names: Hôtel-Dieu de Marseille

General information
- Type: Hotel
- Location: 1 Place Daviel, Marseille, Provence-Alpes-Côte d'Azur, France
- Coordinates: 43.298454°N 5.369697°E
- Groundbreaking: 1753
- Renovated: 2010–2013
- Owner: AXA Real Estate

Design and construction
- Architect: Jacques Hardouin-Mansart

The InterContinental Marseille – Hôtel-Dieu (Occitan: InterContinental Marselha - Ostal Dieu) is a five-star luxury hotel near the Vieux-Port area of Marseille, France. Housed in the Hôtel-Dieu de Marseille building, which served as the city's primary hospital (Hôtel-Dieu) for over eight hundred years, the hotel opened on April 25, 2013, in conjunction with the ongoing Euroméditerranée project. The hotel is part of the InterContinental hotel chain, and it is the fourth InterContinental property in France.

The building sits on the location of the Saint-Esprit Hospital, which was created in 1188. The next six centuries saw the hospital undergo considerable expansion, and the current building was inaugurated by Napoleon III in 1866. In 1963, the building was listed as a registered national monument on the ISMH (Inventaire Supplémentaire des Monuments Historiques). The last patients left in 1993, and in 2003, the hospital was acquired in preparation for development. The property is owned by Paris-based AXA Real Estate.

172 rooms and 22 suites are housed in the hotel, with prices up to $6,600 for the presidential suite. In addition, the hotel hosts two restaurants: "Les Fenêtres Brasserie" and "Alcyone Restaurant", the latter of which is one of four restaurants in Marseille to hold at least one Michelin Star.

== History ==
=== Hospital ===
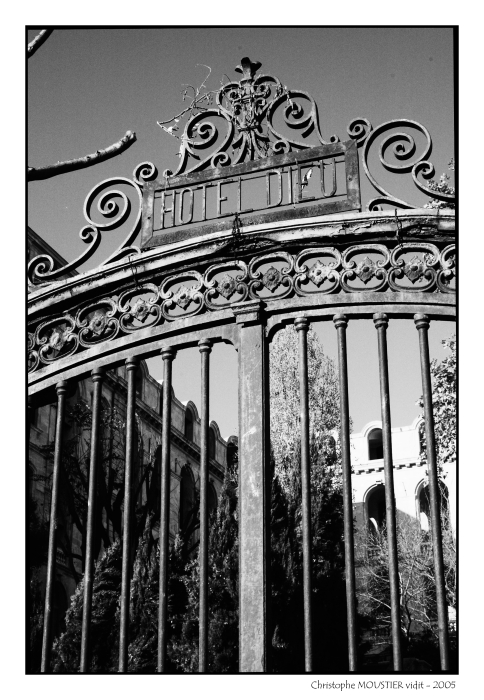
The iron gates of the former Hôtel-Dieu

Though the Hôtel-Dieu's predecessor was founded in 1188, the Hotel-Dieu in its previous incarnation was founded when the Hospital Saint-Jacques de Galice and the Hospital Saint-Esprit merged in 1593, thus becoming Marseille's largest and foremost hospital. Both hospitals had previously served Marseille in the Black Death epidemic of Bubonic Plague, which first reached Marseille in January 1348. However, the combined Hotel-Dieu first achieved widespread renown when esteemed French ophthalmologist Jacques Daviel made significant advances and developments in cataract surgery, when he performed an extracapsular cataract extraction in 1747 at the Hotel-Dieu.

By 1753, the hospital needed substantial expansion to meet the needs of Marseille, and the current building was built under the direction of the court architect of Louis XV, Jacques Hardouin-Mansart de Sagonne. He was a grandson of the eminent Jules Hardouin-Mansart, a famed architect who represented the height of French Baroque architecture and power.

Benefiting from the financial aid of Jean-Etienne Raymond, the project was completed in 1788, and the hospital did not need additional expansion until 1860. The period between 1860 and 1866 saw the Hotel-Dieu rebuilt and remodeled by renowned architect Felix Blanchet, and the transformed hospital was christened by Napoleon III in November of that year.

=== Hotel ===
In 1993, after 805 years of service, the Hotel-Dieu received its last patients, and was converted into a teaching hospital; the hospital completely closed in 2006. Throughout this time, several consortiums were bidding for the redevelopment of the Hotel-Dieu, and four years after the acquisition of the property from the hospital in 2003, it was announced that the site was to become a luxury hotel under the InterContinental brand. Construction and renovations began in 2010, and the rejuvenated Marseille icon reopened on April 25, 2013, about 825 years after the Saint-Esprit Hospital first opened its doors. The hotel's renovations were accomplished by French construction company Eiffage and were developed by Altarea Cogedim.

== Design ==
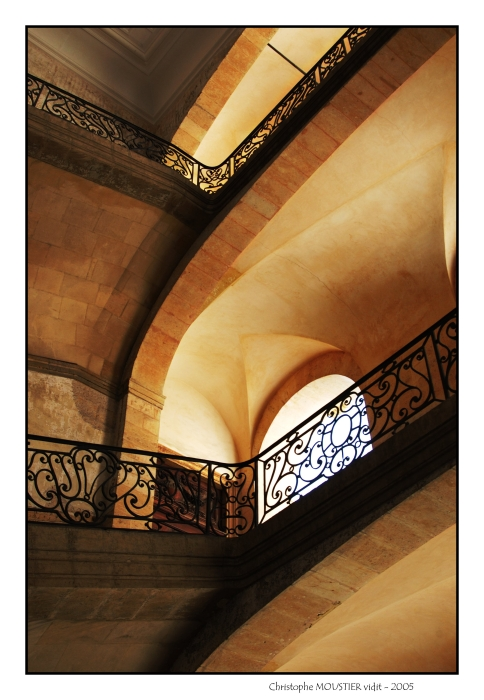
Stairway of the hotel

Similar to numerous other buildings in Marseille built during the corresponding time period, the Hotel-Dieu exhibited French Baroque architecture, while subsequent improvements added touches reminiscent of French Rococo and Neoclassicism, and later, the Second Empire Style. Like many French buildings, it has a French Garden; the ruins of a 12th-century chapel is buried under it. A cultural exhibition of the hotel showcases some of the artifacts recovered from the chapel, some dating back over 2200 years.

The redevelopment of the Hotel-Dieu was acceded to by AAA Bechu Agency and local architecture firm, Tangram. Despite the hotel's storied history, the interior is modernistic, reflecting the Art Deco style as well as the traditional colors of the Mediterranean, orchestrated by Jean-Philippe Nuel. The five-story hotel features twelve meeting rooms with a combined 1000 square meters of event space.

=== Rooms ===
Out of the 194 rooms and suites in the hotel, 22 are suites; of which 15 are junior suites, six are "prestige suites", and one is a "presidential suite". Sevennty-two rooms, including all of the suites, overlook the Vieux-Port.

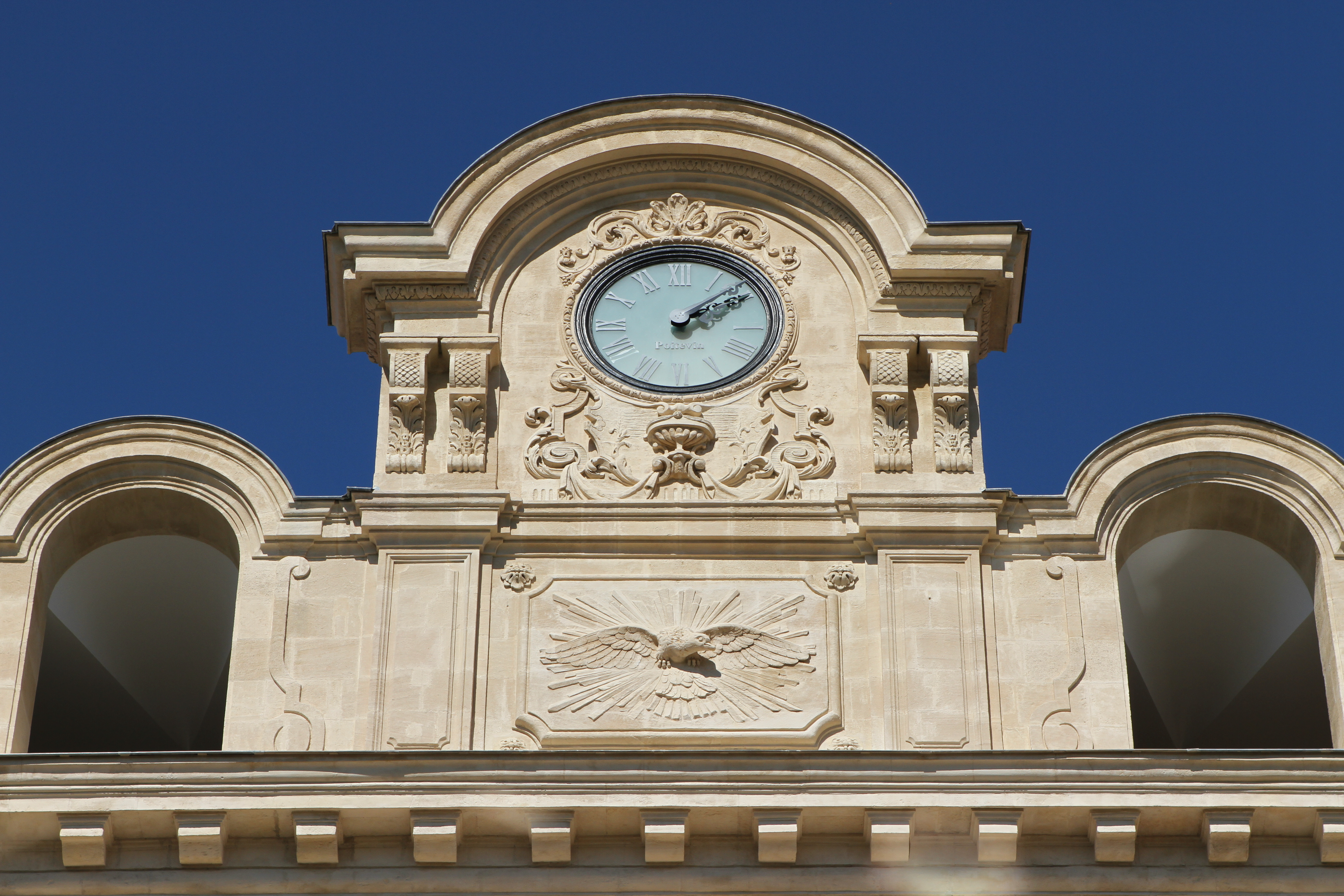
Clock on the façade of the hotel. According to the hotel’s staff, the carving underneath it depicts a dove.

=== Restaurants and bars ===
The InterContinental Marseille features two restaurants, both under the direction of Michelin-starred chef Lionel Lévy, formerly the head chef at 'Une table au Sud', itself a Michelin-starred restaurant. The hotel's terrace hosts the Capian Bar

==== Les Fenêtres Brasserie ====
The hotel's brasserie, named for the Hotel-Dieu's distinctively arched windows, can seat eighty.

==== Alcyone Restaurant ====
The hotel's formal dining restaurant is named after the figure Alcyone in Greek mythology. A few months after its inception, the restaurant was awarded a Michelin star. Aside from the Michelin Guide, other reviewers have also given the restaurant generally positive reviews. The publication France Today illustrated a good impression of the restaurant albeit the restaurant being in a "teething phase", noting that a few tables had a "magical view of the distant city". Prices for a set meal are around 139 Euros.

=== Awards ===
At the 2014 MIPIM Awards, a festival that recognizes architectural and design developments, the InterContinental Marseille was awarded the "Best Refurbished Building" award in honor of the regeneration and renewal of the Hotel-Dieu. The building's renovation also gave it the Haute Qualité Environnementale Certification, and thus the hotel became the second building in the hotel industry to receive the award, which awards institutions for green building in France. Moreover, the hotel was included in the 2014 Condé Nast Traveler Hot List, which recognizes the world's finest hotels, along with the Travel + Leisure "It List", honoring the best new hotels as picked by their editors.

== Gallery ==
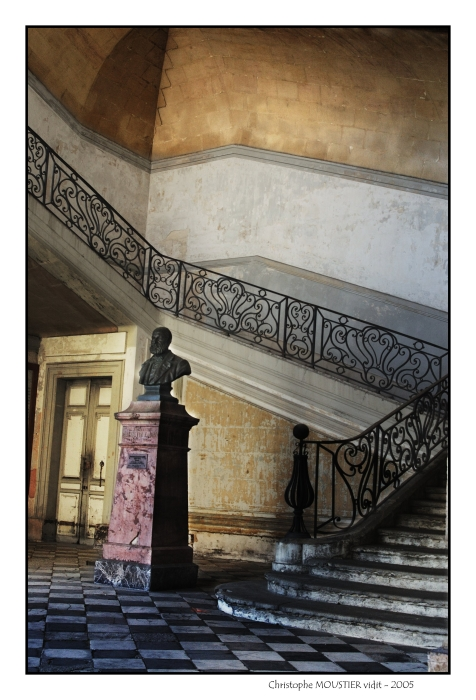
One of two staircases in the Hotel Dieu before renovation

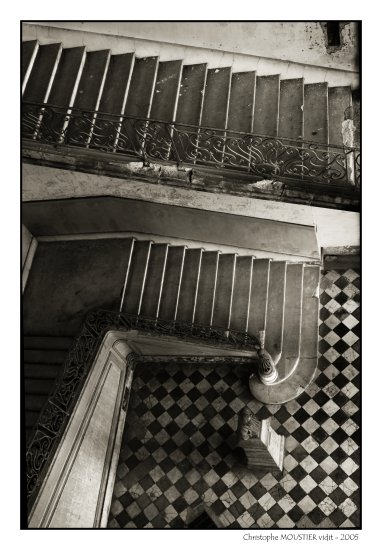
The other staircase (also before renovation) in the Hotel-Dieu featuring a bust of Henri Fabre

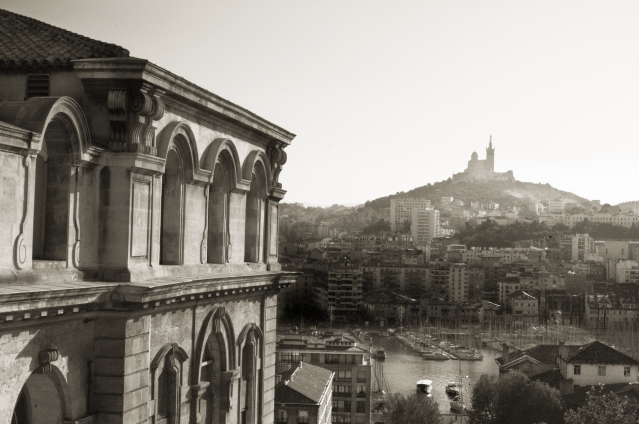
Notre-Dame de la Garde viewed from the Hotel Dieu

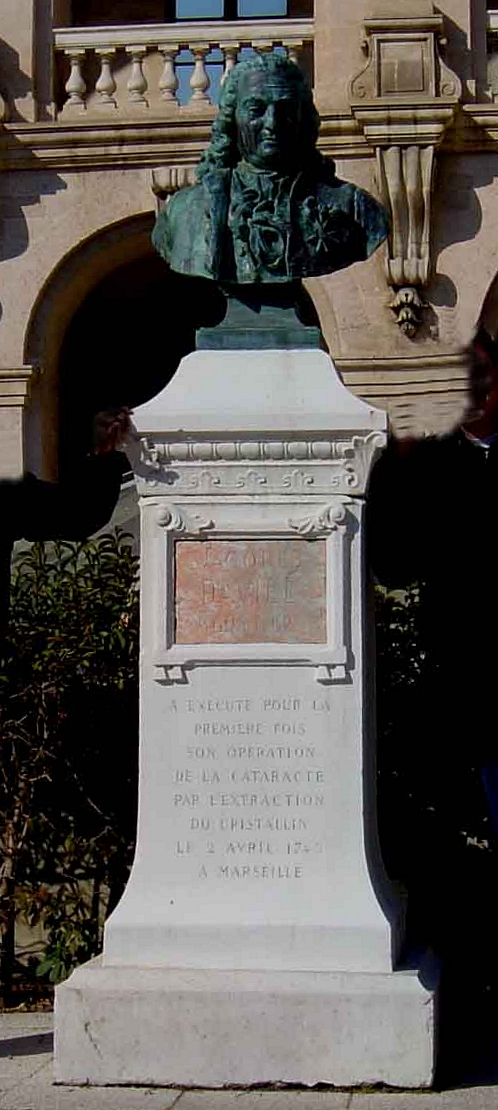
Bust of Jacques Daviel, French ophthalmologist

== See also ==
- InterContinental hotel chain
- InterContinental Carlton Cannes, also in Southern France
- Hôtel-Dieu, for other uses
