= Stefano Boeri =

Italian architect and urban planner (born 1956)

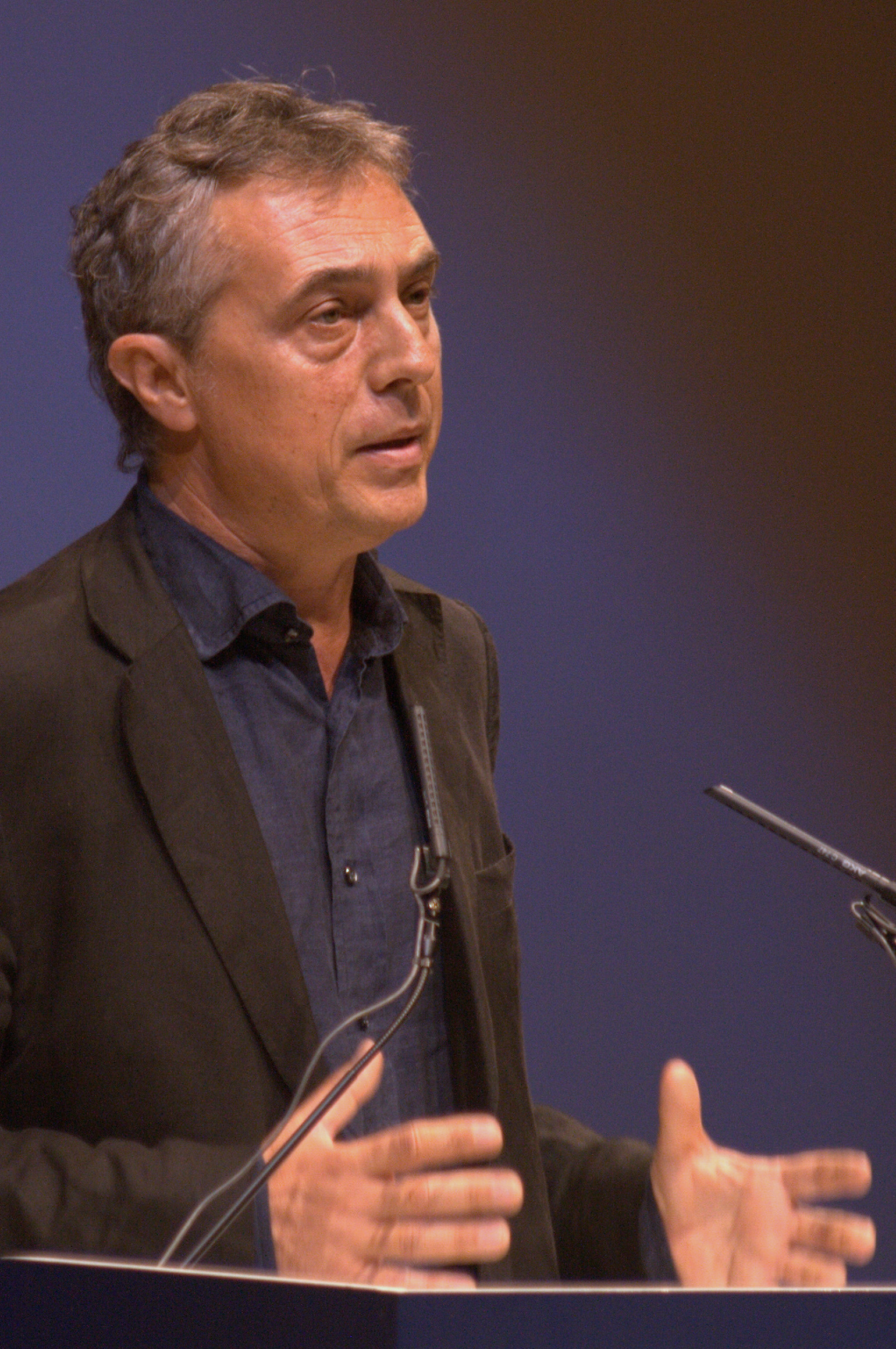
- Boeri in 2009
- Born: 25 November 1956 (age 69); Milan, Italy
- Education: Polytechnic University of Milan Iuav University of Venice
- Occupation: Architect
- Practice: Stefano Boeri Architetti
- Buildings: Vertical Forest; Villa Méditerranée; G8 Maddalena; RCS Headquarters
- Website: https://www.stefanoboeriarchitetti.net/en/

Stefano Boeri (born 25 November 1956) is an Italian architect and urban planner, and a founding partner of Stefano Boeri Architetti. Among his most known projects are the Vertical Forest in Milan, the Villa Méditerranée in Marseille, and the House of the Sea of La Maddalena. He is the professor of urban planning at the Polytechnic University of Milan.

== Biography ==
He is the son of architect and designer Cini Boeri and neurologist Renato Boeri, and the brother of Tito, economist who has held numerous public offices including President of INPS, and Sandro, a journalist. His grandfather was Senator Giovanni Battista Boeri.

Stefano Boeri is an architect and urban planner. He graduated from the Milan Polytechnic with a degree in architecture in 1980, and received a PhD in Urban Planning from the IUAV University of Venice in 1989. In 2023, he was awarded an Honorary PhD in Chemical, Geological and Environmental Sciences by the University of Milan Bicocca. He is a full professor of urban design at the Polytechnic University of Milan, and among the topics addressed in his urban design studio is the coexistence of human, animal, and plant species. This gave rise to the Milano Animal City vision (2014–2016). He has also been a visiting professor at various universities, including the Harvard Graduate School of Design, the Berlage Institute in Rotterdam, the École polytechnique fédérale de Lausanne (EPFL) and the Strelka Institute in Moscow. At Tongji University in Shanghai, he directs the Future City Lab, a postdoctoral research programme that anticipates the mutation of planetary metropolises from the perspectives of biodiversity and urban forestation.

Appointed by the Italian Prime Minister's Office, he is President of the Future of the City Foundation. In addition, he is Chairman of the Scientific Committee of the Forestami Project (2020 - ongoing), the urban forestation project in the Milan metropolitan area that aims to plant 3 million trees by 2030.

Thanks to its "Green Obsession" design approach, Stefano Boeri Architetti and his firm were awarded the UN SDGs Action Award in 2023 by the United Nations in the "Inspire" category because it "envisions sustainable cities and communities that prioritize health and well-being while intensifying climate action through its creative approach to urban planning, ecological connectivity and urban forestry - meeting the UN Sustainable Development Goals".

Among the main actors in the climate change debate in the field of international architecture, at the UN Climate Action Summit 2019, he presented the Green Urban Oases project in New York, carried out together with FAO, C40 and other international research institutes and, in 2017, participates in the Commonwealth Regenerative Development to Reverse Climate Change program; he is co-chair and member of the scientific committee of the World Forum on Urban Forests (Mantua, 2018 - Washington DC, 2023).

During the post-earthquake reconstruction of Central Italy, Stefano Boeri was appointed by the Government's Extraordinary Commissioner for Reconstruction as an Expert Urban Planning Consultant for all earthquake-affected territories in 2016. He was Councillor for Culture, Fashion and Design of the City of Milan from 2011 to 2013. From 2008 to 2010, Stefano Boeri was a member with Richard Burdett, Jacques Herzog of Herzog & de Meuron, and William MacDonough of the Expo 2015 Architects' Consultation, in charge of the design of the concept master plan for the Milanese exposition.

In addition to being an architect, Stefano Boeri is known for his research, visions, and master plans on the future of the urban condition in the world, which have seen him involved in regeneration and development projects for metropolises and large cities, including Shanghai, São Paulo, Moscow, Geneva, Tirana, Eindhoven, Utrecht, Cancun, Riyadh, Cairo, and in Italy Milan, Genoa, Cagliari, Padua, Taranto, and many others.

Since February 2018, he has been the new president of the Milan Triennale, a four-year term. Confirmed for a second term in 2022, he is Commissioner of the 24th International Exhibition "Inequalities" scheduled for 2025.

== Architecture and Urbanism ==
Stefano Boeri is involved in research and planning activities in architecture and urbanism on an international level. He founded Boeri Studio in 1999 in partnership with Gianandrea Barreca and Giovanni LaVarra. In 2011 he founded Stefano Boeri Architetti, in partnership with Francesca Cesa Bianchi (since 2019), Marco Giorgio (since 2019) and Pietro Chiodi (since 2023). Stefano Boeri Architetti has offices in Milan, Tirana, and Shanghai (founded, in 2014, with Yibo Xu). In 2018, he founded Stefano Boeri Interiors, with Giorgio Donà.

The practice's work includes projects ranging from urban planning to architecture, from interior design to product design, with a focus on the environmental and geopolitical implications of various urban processes. The design approach, Green Obsession, is described in the book 'Green Obsession: Trees Towards Cities, Humans Towards Forests' (Actar, 2021) focuses on the integration of living vegetation in urban spaces through different strategies and scales, and was recognised with the UN SDGs Action Awards from the United Nations.

Among its best-known projects is the Vertical Forest (Boeri Studio) in the Isola district of Milan, two 112- and 80-meter skyscrapers whose facades accommodate a floristic biodiversity that accommodates in the complex 800 trees (of 480 medium and large size, 300 from smaller sizes), 15000 perennials and/or ground cover plants and 5000 shrubs. The towers, a new model of densification in height of greenery in the city, contribute to significant energy savings, environment and urban biodiversity without implying an expansion of the city into the territory. The Bosco Verticale has received numerous accolades, including the 2014 International Highrise Award sponsored by the Frankfurt Museum of Architecture and the CTBUH in 2015, as the "Best Tall Building Worldwide", sponsored at the Council on Tall Building and Urban Habitat and the Chicago Institute of Technology. The model was later adapted to urban contexts in other cities, including Nanjing, Utrecht, Paris and Eindhoven (in a social housing version).

Among urban-scale projects, Stefano Boeri presents the "Forest City" project at COP15. "Forest Cities" are medium-sized urban settlements that are going to combine the challenge of energy self-sufficiency with the challenge of increasing biodiversity and effectively improving air quality in urban areas, thanks to the multiplication of urban plant and biological surfaces. Forest Cities' are medium-sized urban settlements that combine the challenge of energy self-sufficiency with the challenge of increasing biodiversity and effectively improving air quality in urban areas through the multiplication of urban plant and biological areas.

Boeri has developed major waterfront redevelopment projects at the European level, including the ports of Marseille, Genoa, Thessaloniki, Mytilene, Naples, Trieste, and La Maddalena. Major urban interventions include projects realised or developed for Milan, Rome, Moscow, Beijing, São Paulo, Qingdao, Marseille, Astana, Venice, Bolzano, Doha.

In 2013, on the occasion of Marseille European Capital of Culture, the Villa Méditerranée, the 9,000 sqm exhibition and research center designed by Boeri Studio that overlooks the port of Marseille and is intended to host cultural and research events on Mediterranean themes, is inaugurated. Boeri designs the Villa Méditerranée as a meeting place and fusion of the different identities present in theMediterranean, and places the sea as a reference space, thanks to the artificial dock that offers the 36-meter-high conference space a view of a large water square below.

From 2008 to 2010 Boeri was a member, along with Richard Burdett, Jacques Herzog of Herzog & de Meuron and William MacDonough, of the Expo 2015 architects' advisory board, responsible for the design of the concept masterplan for the Milanese exposition.

In 2010 Boeri saw the completion of the last skyscraper of the RCS MediaGroup headquarters, for which Boeri Studio was responsible for the entire 90,000 sqm masterplan following the winning of the international competition in 2001. Building A is a long building whose 21 500 sqm are intended to house the offices of Rizzoli Libri. The project sees the light from the demolition of the old Rizzoli building, and its facade inflections create a dialogue with the rest of the buildings already completed for the RCS headquarters (building C).

In 2009, Boeri completed the redevelopment of the former Military Arsenal on La Maddalena, Sardinia, creating a series of new spaces including a conference center, commercial spaces and a marina. The project, originally conceived to host the 2009 G8, then moved to L'Aquila by the Berlusconi government, was completed in just 18 months and then seized following a scandallinked to bribery and illegitimate procurement. The complex is a combination of new construction andconversions of existing buildings, and includes a conference center, two large commercial spaces, a dock for 700 boats, all designed and built with strict respect for the natural landscape and following strict principles of sustainable architecture. The Sea House, the conference center, is a glass and basalt prism built cantilevering over the water. The large conference hall is suspended 6meters above the water and looks toward Gallura. The design interprets the relationship between the surrounding elementnaturals and the rigorous forms of the Italian military architecture tradition.

== Editorial Activity ==
Stefano Boeri was editor of the international architecture periodical Domus from 2004 to 2007. The final issue of the magazine under his editorship, entitled Esperanto, was produced without text in order to explore a universal visual language that could transcend language barriers. This edition featured a cover by Ettore Sottsass and contributions in the form of drawings by Enzo Mari, as well as images by Zaha Hadid, Frank Gehry, Hans Ulrich Obrist, Yona Friedman, Gaetano Pesce, Olafur Eliasson, Rem Koolhaas, Alessandro Mendini, and Gabriele Basilico.

He edited the magazine Abitare from 2007 to 2010. He has also collaborated with various other magazines and newspapers, including Wired.

He is the author of numerous books on urbanism, architecture, and contemporary culture. His publications include "L'anticittà", "Biomilano: Glossary of Ideas for a Metropolis Based on Biodiversity" and "USE: Uncertain States of Europe". In his work Doing More with Less, Boeri proposes a new, more pragmatic political vision capable of interpreting the fundamental themes of contemporary living, from rights and participation to culture and architecture.

Together with Rem Koolhaas and Hans Ulrich Obrist, he is the co-author of Mutations, an atlas of urban change on a global scale prepared with the Harvard University research group. Together with photographer Gabriele Basilico, he is the author of Italy: Transversal Sections of a Country.

In 1997, he was the managing curator of the architecture section at the Milan Triennale.

== Research activity ==
Stefano Boeri is a member of the scientific committee of Skolkovo Innovation Center in Moscow, together with Jean Pistre, Speech, David Chipperfield, Mohsen Mostafavi, Kazuyo Sejima, OMA, Herzog & de Meuron.

His research activities focus on the analysis of urban territories and the ways in which different disciplines interpret and represent the contemporary city. He is the founder of the research agency Multiplicity, a multidisciplinary collective composed of architects, geographers, artists, urban planners, photographers, sociologists, economists and filmmakers, active in the production of design strategies, workshops, installations and publications related to urban transformation processes.

Among the projects developed by Multiplicity is Solid Sea, a research on migration flows in the Mediterranean presented in 2002 in Kassel for Documenta XI. Other projects include The Road Map, focused on the territorial borders of the West Bank, and USE - Uncertain States of Europe, a study on forms of urban self-organisation in European contexts.

== Political activity ==
In 2010, he ran in the Democratic Party primaries for mayor of Milan, but was defeated by Giuliano Pisapia. In the 2011 local elections he was elected city councillor with around 13,000 preferences and on 10 June of the same year he was appointed Councillor for Culture, Fashion, Design and Expo of the Municipality of Milan.

During the councillorship, which lasted about 18 months, he promoted cultural initiatives such as Piano City and BookCity, launched the Officine Creative Ansaldo (OCA), set up the World City Forum - a network of 500 associations linked to 104 international communities in Milan - and launched the Planetary Table in view of Expo 2015. His promoted activities also include exhibitions and shows, including a retrospective on Pablo Picasso that recorded record numbers of visitors in Milan's history, and the foundation of the Distretto Agricolo Milanese (DAM), which brings together farmers operating within the city's territory. During his tenure, he supported the installation of the work L.O.V.E. (also known as Finger Point) by the contemporary artist Maurizio Cattelan, placed in front of Palazzo Mezzanotte, headquarters of the Milan Stock Exchange.

On 29 November 2011 he lost the Expo delegation[23] following disagreements with the municipal administration. On 17 March 2013 he resigned as councillor following a cabinet reshuffle.

In 2013 he was invited to join the working group New Narrative for Europe, set up by the European Commission and composed of artists, intellectuals and scientists. The final report, presented in 2014 by Commission President José Barroso, included Boeri's proposed idea of a Europe conceived as a "megacity" interconnected through transport and communication infrastructures.

== Selected projects ==
=== Stefano Boeri Architetti ===
- Urban Oasis - Bratislava, Slovakia, 2024 - in progress
- Ramagrama Stupa - masterplan, Lumbini, Nepal, 2024 - in progress
- Riqualificazione Case ALER - Monza, Italy, 2023 - in progress
- Tratturi Masterplan - masterplan, Regione Molise, Italy, 2023 - in progress
- Dubai Vertical Forest - Dubai, United Arab Emirates, 2022 - in progress - presented at COP27 in Sharm, the project is the first Vertical Forest prototype for MENA areas, with the aim of integrating the benefits of urban forestation in arid climates
- Borgo Verde Conegliano - masterplan, Conegliano, Italy 2022 - in progress
- A Green Promenade for the Cagliari waterfront - Cagliari, Italy 2022 - in progress
- Redevelopment of former Banca d'Italia - Cremona, Italy, 2022 - in progress
- Quattro Volte - Archaeological Park of Ostia Antica, Rome, Italy, 2022
- Hanji House - pavilion, Venice, Italy, 2021 - 2022
- Rehabilitation Center - Shenzhen, China, 2020 - in progress
- Xi'an Culture Modern Technology Experience Center - Xi'an, China, 2020 - in progress
- A dead forest - Syracuse, Italy, 2019 - scenic project for the tragedy Le Trojanes of Euripides
- New Access to the Domus Aurea - Rome, Italy, 2019 - 2021
- The Polcevera Park and the Red Circle - Genoa, Italy, 2019-in-progress
- Tirana Vertical Forest - vertical forest, Tirana, Albania, 2019 - in progress
- Parco Italia - vision, Italy, 2019 - in progress
- Norcia Multipurpose and Civil Protection Centre - Norcia, Italy, 2018
- Polo del gusto di Amatrice - Amatrice, Italy, 2018
- Palazzo Verde - vertical forest, Antwerp, Belgium, 2018 - 2021
- Bosconavigli - Milan, Italy, 2018-in-progress
- Redevelopment of Matera Centrale Station - Matera, Italy, 2018
- Trudo Vertical Forest - the first Vertical Forest in social housing, Eindhoven, The Netherlands, 2017- 2021
- Sala 5: Stanza del Cartone di Raffaello - staging, Biblioteca Pinacoteca Ambrosiana, Milan, Italy, 2017–19
- Easyhome Huanggang Vertical Forest City Complex - vertical forest, Huanggang, Hubei, China, 2017 - 2021
- Three New Schools for Tirana - Tirana, Albania, 2017 - ongoing
- Wonderwoods Vertical Forest - vertical forest, Utrecht, The Netherlands, 2017 - in progress
- Shanghai Hecheng Renovation - office building, Shanghai, China, 2017
- Nanjing Vertical Forest - vertical forests, 200 and 107m, Nanjing, China, 2016 - in progress
- Ca' delle Alzaie - Treviso, Italy, 2016
- La Torre dei Cedri - 117m residential Vertical Forest, Chavannes-Prés-Renens, Lausanne, Switzerland, 2015 - in progress
Bosco Verticale, Milan
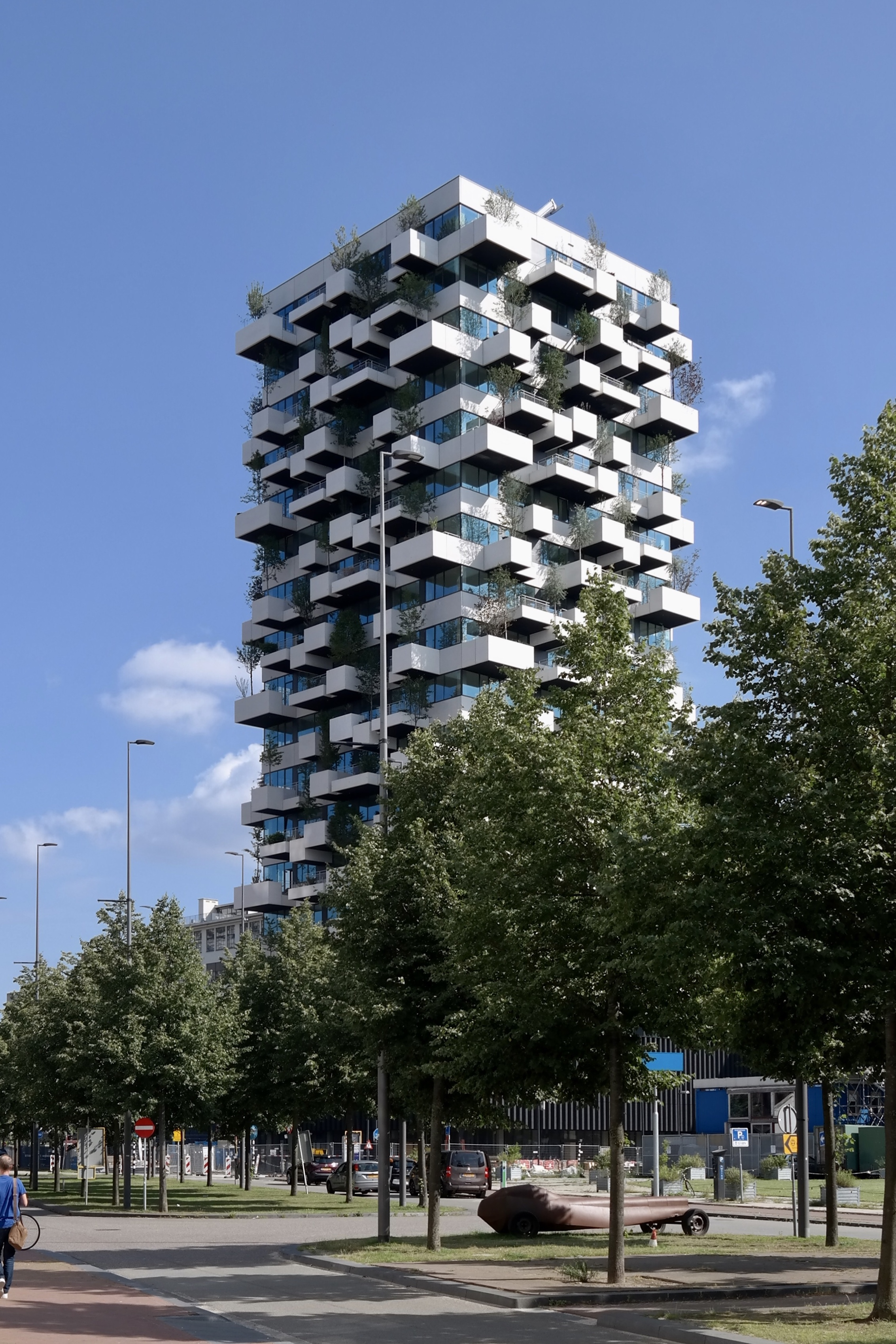
Trudo Vertical Forest in Eindhoven, Netherlands.

=== Stefano Boeri Interiors ===
- Requalification of Santa Chiara Convent – Piacenza, Italy
- Italian Pavilion – Frankfurt, Germany, 2024 – Guest of Honour at the 76th Frankfurt Buchmesse
- Pollenzo 2.0 – Pollenzo (Cuneo), Italy, 2024
- Swing – Milan, Italy, 2023 – collective installation for the Milan Design Week 2023
- Floating Forest – Milan, Italy, 2022 – installation for the Milano Design Week
- Supersalone – Milan, Italy, 2021

=== Boeri Studio ===
- New Policlinico Hospital - Milan, Italy, 2007; 2009–2010; 2017-2018 2020–2025
- Bicocca 307, Milan, 2015
- Expo 2015 - Milan, Italy, 2009 - Concept Masterplan developed with Herzog & De Meuron, Richard Burdett and William MacDonough
- Vertical Forest - Milan, Italy, 2014 - residential towers, 112 and 80 m, Biodiversity residential complex
- Villa Méditerranée - Port of Marseille, France 2013 - Exhibition and research centre on Mediterranean themes
- Casa Del Mare - Ex Arsenale La Maddalena, Sardinia, Italy, 2009 - Conference and exhibition centre,
- Sea Pavilion - Ex Arsenale La Maddalena, Sardinia, Italy, 2009 - Commercial, exhibition, didactic and touristic space related to nautical and sailing activities, 10 000 sqm
- Ex Arsenale Residence-Hotel - Ex Arsenale La Maddalena, Sardinia, Italy, 2009
- RCS Tower A2 - Skyscraper of offices inside RCS Milan Headquarters, 2009
- Incubator for Art - Milan, Italy, 2006 - Cultural and exhibition centre, incubator for contemporary art
- RCS Rizzoli Headquarters - masterplan and architecture, Milan, 2006
- Stadio Giuseppe Meazza - Maintenance and graphic refurbishment of the G. Meazza - Milan, Italy, 2004
- ENEL Bagnore 3 geothermal power plant - Grosseto, Italy, 1997
- Falck Bic - Sesto San Giovanni, Milan, Italy, 1998
- Molo Beverello, project for a new waterfront, Naples 1996

== Curatorial activity and exhibitions ==
Stefano Boeri's works have been exhibited in numerous international institutions, including the Venice Biennale, the Nederlands Architectuurinstituut in Rotterdam, the Institut Français d'Architecture (IFA) in Paris, the Centre d'Architecture Arc-en-Rêve in Bordeaux, the Tokyo Art Gallery, the Chengdu Biennale, the Milan Triennale, Beijing Design Week, the Salone Internazionale del Mobile in Milan, the Kunst-Werke Institute for Contemporary Art in Berlin and the Musée d'Art Moderne de la Ville de Paris.

He was a member of the Scientific Committee of the Uffizi Galleries from 2015 to 2018.

In 2017, he curated SUSAS - Shanghai Urban Space Art Season, an event promoted by the Shanghai Municipality dedicated to urban planning, architecture and public art.

From 2011 to 2013, he served as Culture Councillor of the Municipality of Milan, during which he launched the BookCity and Piano City initiatives, dedicated respectively to the promotion of reading and piano music. Both events became part of the city's annual cultural calendar.

In Milan, he also conceived and curated the MI/Arch festival, organised by the Politecnico di Milano in 2013 on the occasion of the university's 150th anniversary, with the participation of international architects such as David Chipperfield, Grafton Architects, Arata Isozaki, Rem Koolhaas, Daniel Libeskind, César Pelli, Renzo Piano and Kazuyo Sejima. He is also the artistic director of Milano Arch Week, an event promoted by the City of Milan together with the Milan Polytechnic, the Milan Triennale and the Giangiacomo Feltrinelli Foundation.

In 2012, he curated “São Paulo Calling”, an international research project dedicated to informal settlements and favelas in six global metropolises, with travelling exhibitions held in São Paulo, Rome, Mumbai, Nairobi, Moscow, Baghdad and Medellin. In the same year, he was part of the selection committee for the Pavillon Spéciale in Paris, as a member of the international committee of experts.

From 2007 to 2012 he was the creator and director of Festarch, an international architecture festival organised by the magazine Abitare (Cagliari 2007/2008 and Perugia 2011/2012) with the greatest exponents of contemporary architecture.

In 2008, he conceived and curated Geodesign, one of the main projects and events on the calendar of 2008 Turin World Design Capital.

=== Exhibitions ===
- Quattro Volte, Ostia Antica Archaeological Park, Rome, 2022; staging of the exhibition 'Chi è di scena! One hundred years of performances in ancient Ostia (1922–2022)'.
- Trees, Shanghai, 2021; the exhibition celebrates trees as a source of great aesthetic inspiration for human societies, echoing the latest scientific discoveries that shed new light on the intelligence of living nature and plants
- Supersalone, Milan, 2021: Supersalone is the unique concept of a new format for the special event realised for the Salone del Mobile, Milan
- Framing the Wild, Paris, 2019; Technal's exhibition space for Batimat 2019
- Vertical Woods, Metropolis of the Future, New York, 2019; the exhibition proposes reflections on the most efficient sustainable strategies for contemporary cities, with a focus on Urban Forestation
- Les Forêts Verticales et Métropoles Biodiverses, Lyon, 2019; Stefano Boeri Architetti's exhibition on the theme of regenerative development
- Homo Faber: Crafting a more human future, Isola di San Giorgio, Venice, 2018; the international exhibition on the value and excellence of art crafts
- The Future of Living and the Planet of the Future, Milan, 2018; the scenario of creative experimentation of this installation proposes a possible anticipation of design responses to the devastating effects of climate change, starting with the rising level of the oceans
- Lighthenge Edison, Milan, 2018; urban light installation that makes the idea of energy and its implications in contemporary cultures and societies visible, scenic and shareable
- Rebirths. Works of art rescued from the earthquake in Amatrice and Accumoli, Rome, 2017; the installation gives new life to the heritage of works of art recovered from the rubble and highlights the value of the culture sedimented in the small towns of the Italian territory
- Radura, Milan, 2016; temporary installation, itinerant micro-construction
- Urban Tree Lounge, 2016; the installation stems from the idea of giving life to a space that is covered and at the same time open to pedestrian flows, dynamic yet restful. Thus was born the model of an artificial tree, in whose shade one can find rest and shelter
- China View, Beijing, 2015; a unique space above the city where people feel as if they are floating among the clouds
- São Paulo Calling, São Paulo, 2012; international research project on informal settlements in São Paulo, Rome, Mumbai, Nairobi, Moscow, Bagdad and Medellin, curated by Stefano Boeri
- Meet Design, Mercati Traiani Roma 2011, Palazzo Bertalazzone di S. Fermo, Turin, 2011; Italian design from 1948 to the present day, a selection of unusual historical pieces, Exhibit design curated by Stefano Boeri Architetti
- Biomilano - Exhibition of six ideas for a metropolis of biodiversity, Milan, Beijing, 2011; curated by Stefano Boeri
- Sustainable dystopias, Venice Architecture Biennial 2008; Louisiana 2008; exhibition on Boeri Studio's research on the reconciliation of city and nature
- Solid Sea, Documenta 11 Kessel, 2002; Rotterdam Filmfestival 2003; Fondazione Pistoletto, Biella 2003; Spazio Lima, Milan 2003; Forme d'acqua, Palermo 2004; Forme d'acqua, Dar Bash Hamba, Tunis 2004; exhibition on Multiplicity's research on the Mediterranean, curated by Multiplicity
- Border Device(s) - The Road Map, Berlin Kunst Werke 2003; Venice Art Biennial 2003; Musée d'Art Moderne Paris 2003; Atteggiamenti, Genève 2003; Roomade, Brussels 2003; Witte de Witt, Rotterdam 2003; Konsthall, Malmö 2004; Stateless Nation Bethlehem Peace Center, Bethlehem 2004; Festival Filosofia, Modena 2004; Biennale d'Architettura, Beijing 2004;Birzeit University, West Bank 2004; Holon Digital Art Lab Center, Tel Aviv 2004; Museo Laboratorio, Philadelphia 2004; ZKM Center for Art and Media, Karlsruhe 2005; Musac, Leon 2005; HMKV, Dortmund 2005; Paltform Paradis, Ein Hawd, Haifa 2008. Exhibition on Multiplicity's research on the proliferation of controversial boundaries in the contemporary world
- New Trend in Architecture, Porto, Rotterdam, Tokyo, 2002; Travelling exhibition on new European and Japanese architecture
- USE - Uncertain States of Europe, Bordeaux 2000; Brussels 2001; Tokyo 2001; Perth 2002; Milan 2002; exhibition on Multiplicity's research on the condition of Europe presented within Mutations, curated by Multiplicity
- Sections of the Italian landscape, Venice Architecture Biennial 1998; exhibition on Stefano Boeri and Gabriele Basilico's research on the Italian territory, curated by Boeri Studio

== Bibliography ==
- Bosco Verticale. Morfologia di un bosco verticale (Rizzoli, 2025)
- Transforming Biocities. Progettare spazi urbani ispirati alla natura (Springer, Berlino, 2023)
- Green Obsession. Trees Towards Cities, Humans Towards Forests (Actar, Barcellona, 2021)
- Urbania (Laterza Edizioni, Milano, 2021)
- La Maddalena, recupero dell'ex arsenale militare (Skira, Milano, 2017)
- Bosco Verticale (curato da Action Group & Stefano Boeri Architetti, Action Group srl, Milano, 2017)
- La città scritta. Carlo Aymonino, Vittorio Gregotti, Aldo Rossi, Bernardo Secchi, Giancarlo De Carlo (Quodlibet, Macerata 2016)
- Un bosco verticale (a cura di G. Musante, A. Muzzonigro, Corraini Edizioni, Mantova 2015)
- Fare di più con meno (Il Saggiatore, Milano 2013)
- L'Anticittà (Laterza, Bari, 2011)
- Biomilano (a cura di M. Brunello e S. Pellegrini, Corraini Edizioni, Mantova 2011)
- Milano, Cronache dell'abitare (a cura di Multiplicity.lab, Mondadori, Milano, 2007)
- USE: Uncertain States of Europe (Skira Editore, Milano 2003)
- Mutations (con R. Koolhaas, H. Ulrich Obrist, S. Kwinter, N. Tazi, Actar Barcellona, 2000)
- Sezioni del paesaggio italiano (con G. Basilico, ART&, Udine, 1997)
- Il territorio che cambia. Ambienti, paesaggi e immagini della regione milanese (con A. Lanzani, E. Marini, Segesta, Milano, 1993)
