= Fort Saint-Jean (Marseille) =

French fortification from 1660

- Marseille, France
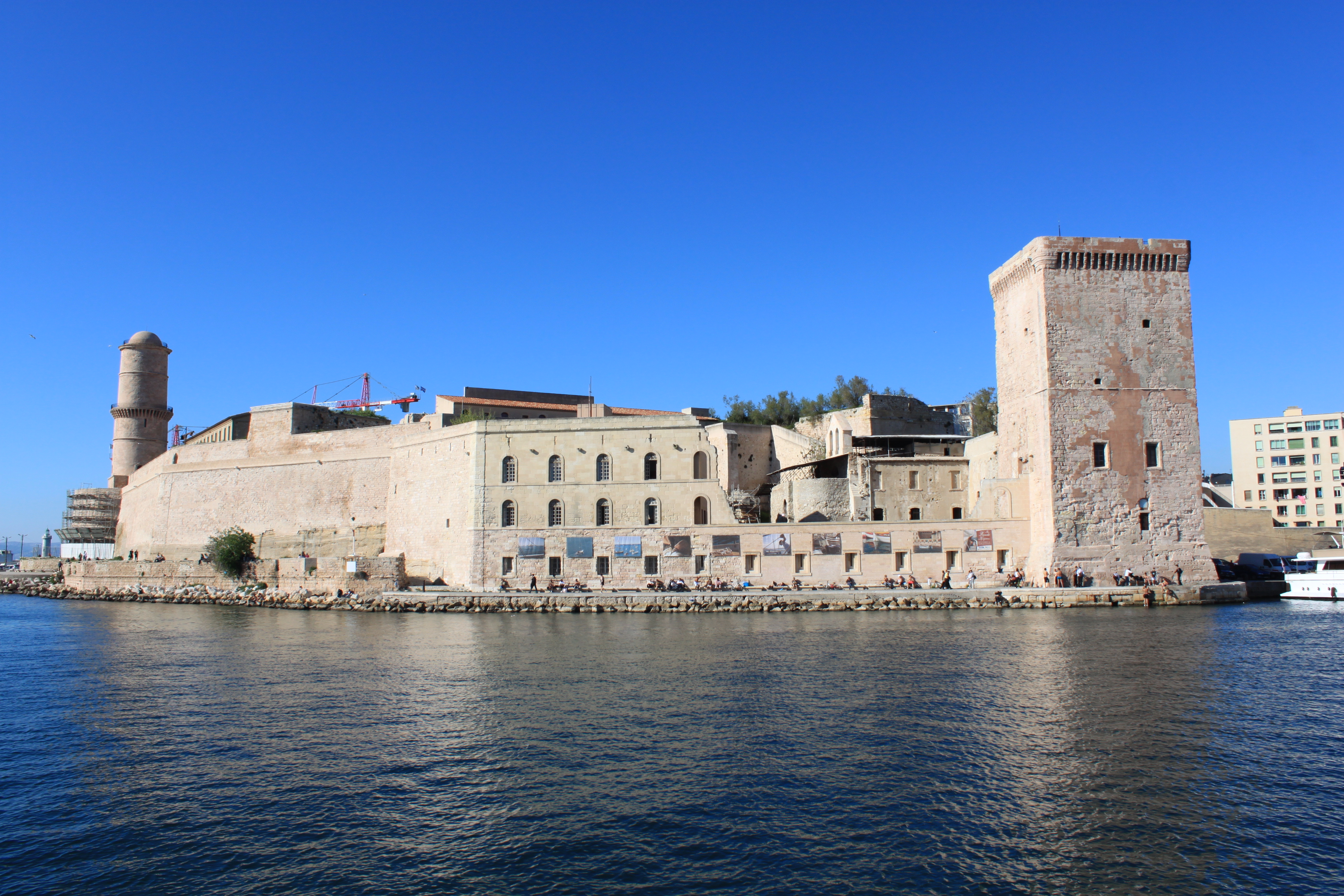

Site information
- Type: Fort
- Owner: Museum
- Controlled by: France
- Open to the public: Special occasions

Location

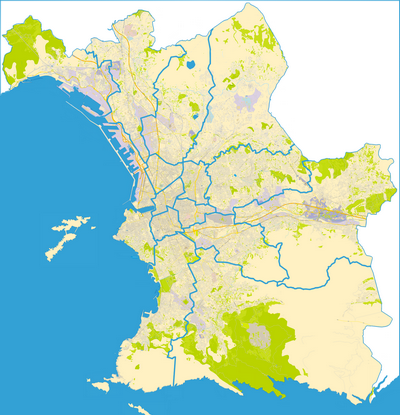
- Location within Marseille Location within France
- Coordinates: 43.2953°N 5.3619°E

Site history
- Built: 1660

Fort Saint-Jean (French pronunciation: [fɔʁ sɛ̃ʒɑ̃]; Occitan: Fort Sant Joan) is a fortification in Marseille, built in 1660 by Louis XIV at the entrance to the Old Port. Since 2013, it has been linked by two foot-bridges to the historical district Le Panier and to the Museum of European and Mediterranean Civilisations.

== History ==
Fort Saint-Jean was built on a site earlier occupied by the Military Order of the Knights Hospitaller of Saint John, from which the new building derived its name. Fort Saint-Nicolas was constructed at the same time on the opposite side of the harbour. Commenting on their construction, Louis XIV said, "We noticed that the inhabitants of Marseille were extremely fond of nice fortresses. We wanted to have our own at the entrance to this great port." In fact, the two new forts were built in response to a local uprising against the governor, rather than for the defence of the city: their cannons pointed inwards towards the town, not outwards towards the sea.

Two earlier buildings were incorporated into the structure of the fort: the twelfth century Commandry of the Knights Hospitaller of St John of Jerusalem, which served as a monastic hospice during the crusades; and the fifteenth century tower of René I, King of Provence.

In April 1790, Fort Saint-Jean was seized by a revolutionary mob who decapitated the chevalier de Beausse, commander of the royal garrison, when he was captured after refusing to surrender the fortress. During the subsequent French Revolution the fort was used as a prison, holding Louis Philippe II, Duke of Orléans, and two of his sons, Louis-Charles, Count of Beaujolais, and Antoine Philippe, Duke of Montpensier. Following the overthrow of Robespierre in 1794, about a hundred Jacobin prisoners held in the fort were massacred.

Throughout the 19th and early 20th centuries, Fort Saint-Jean was in the possession of the French Army, who utilised it as a barracks and clearing station for the Army of Africa. During the years when the French Foreign Legion was based mainly in North Africa (1830 to 1962), the fort was a final stop-off point for recruits for the Legion destined for basic training in Algeria.

During World War II Fort Saint-Jean was occupied by the German military in November 1942. In August 1944, during the liberation of Marseilles, the explosion of a munitions depot within the fort destroyed much of its historic battlements and buildings. Although returned to the French Army, Fort Saint-Jean remained in a neglected and disused state until it was passed to the Ministry of Cultural Affairs in 1960. Classified as a historical monument in 1964, the damaged portions of the fort were reconstructed between 1967 and 1971.

In 2013, the Fort Saint-Jean became part of the Museum of European and Mediterranean Civilisations (MuCEM). The major buildings comprising the complex include:

- the tower of King René will be dedicated to the history of the site;
- the building DRASSM will host a documentation center; and
- the building Georges Henri Rivière will be reserved for temporary exhibitions.

== Gallery ==
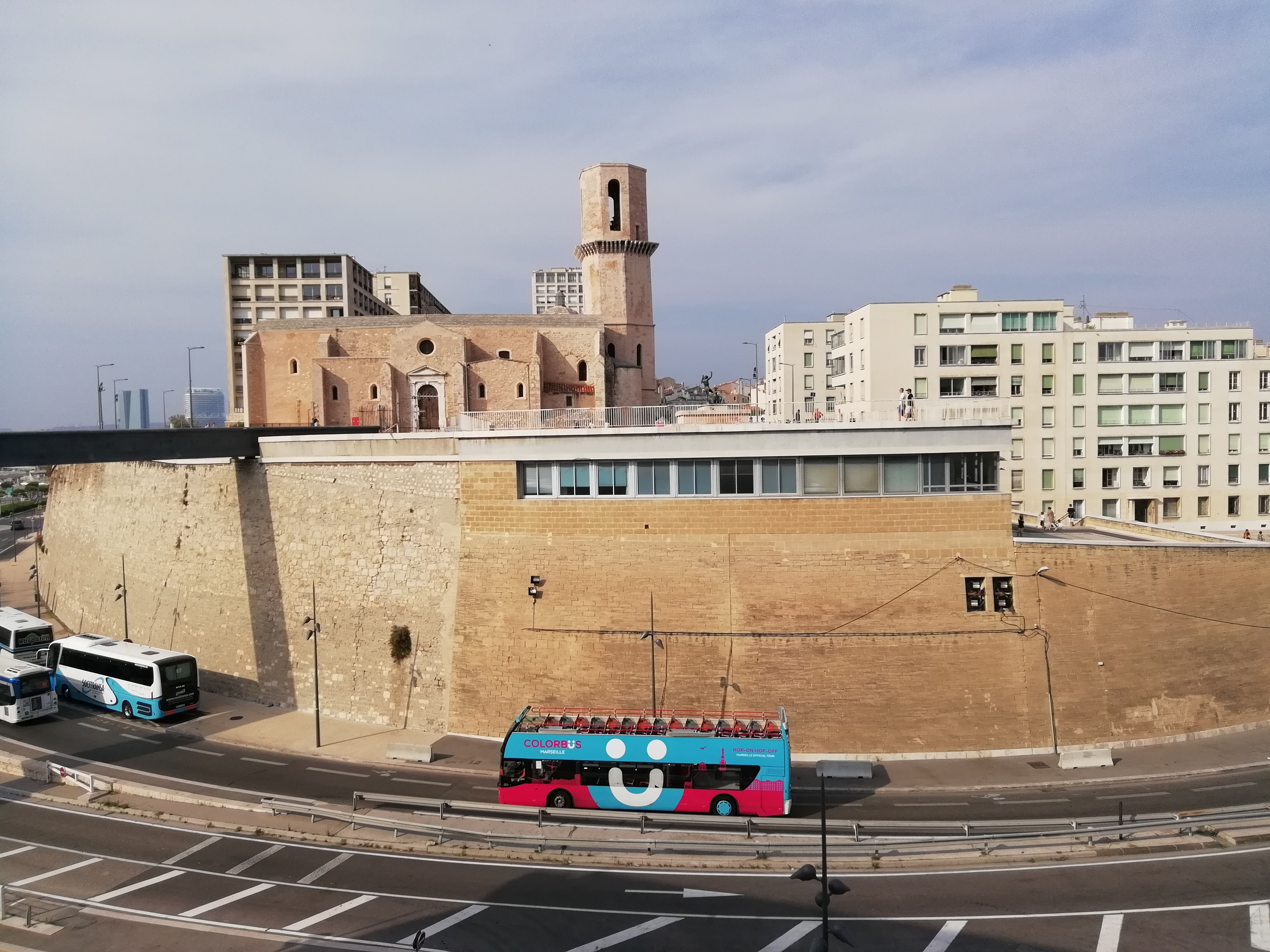

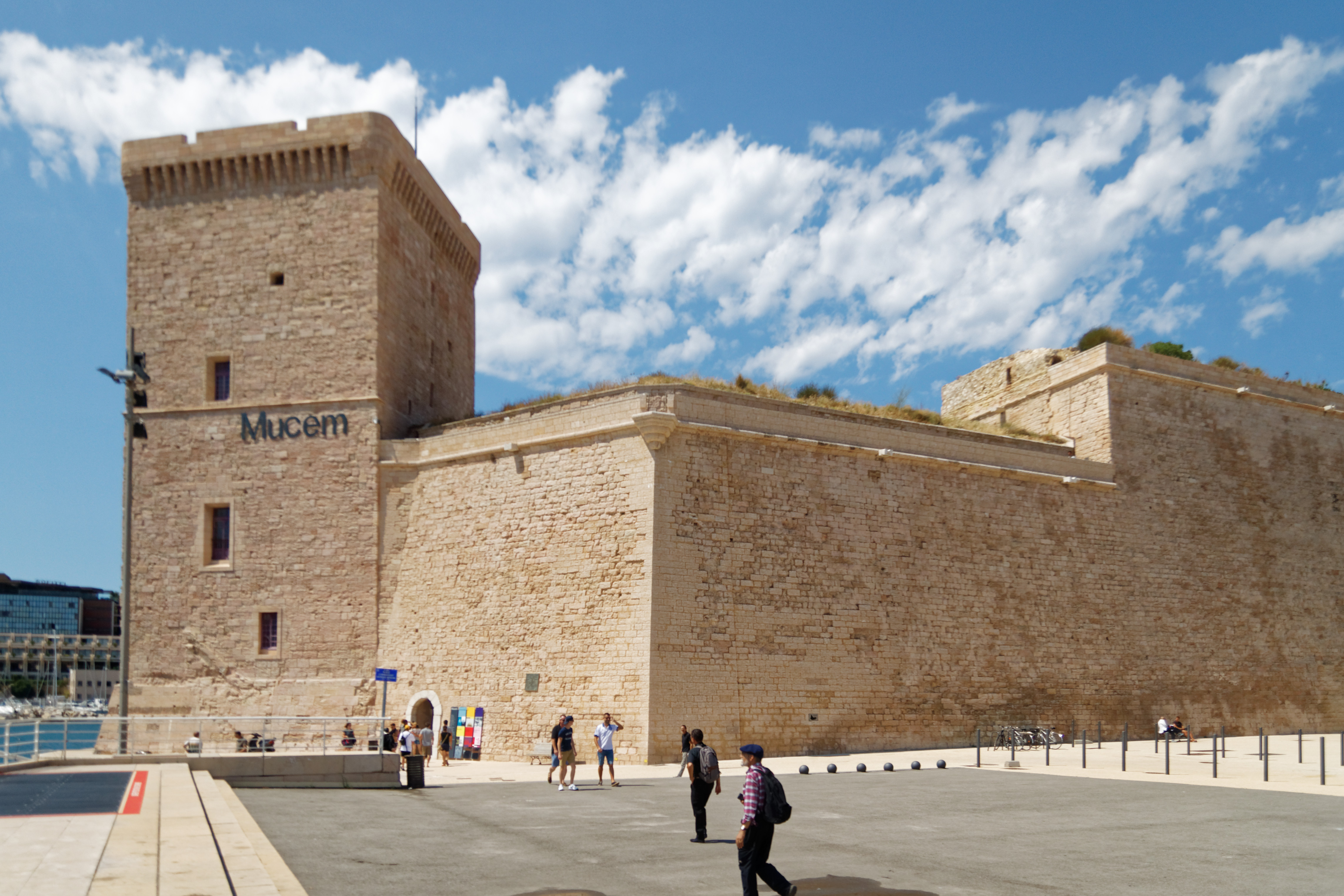

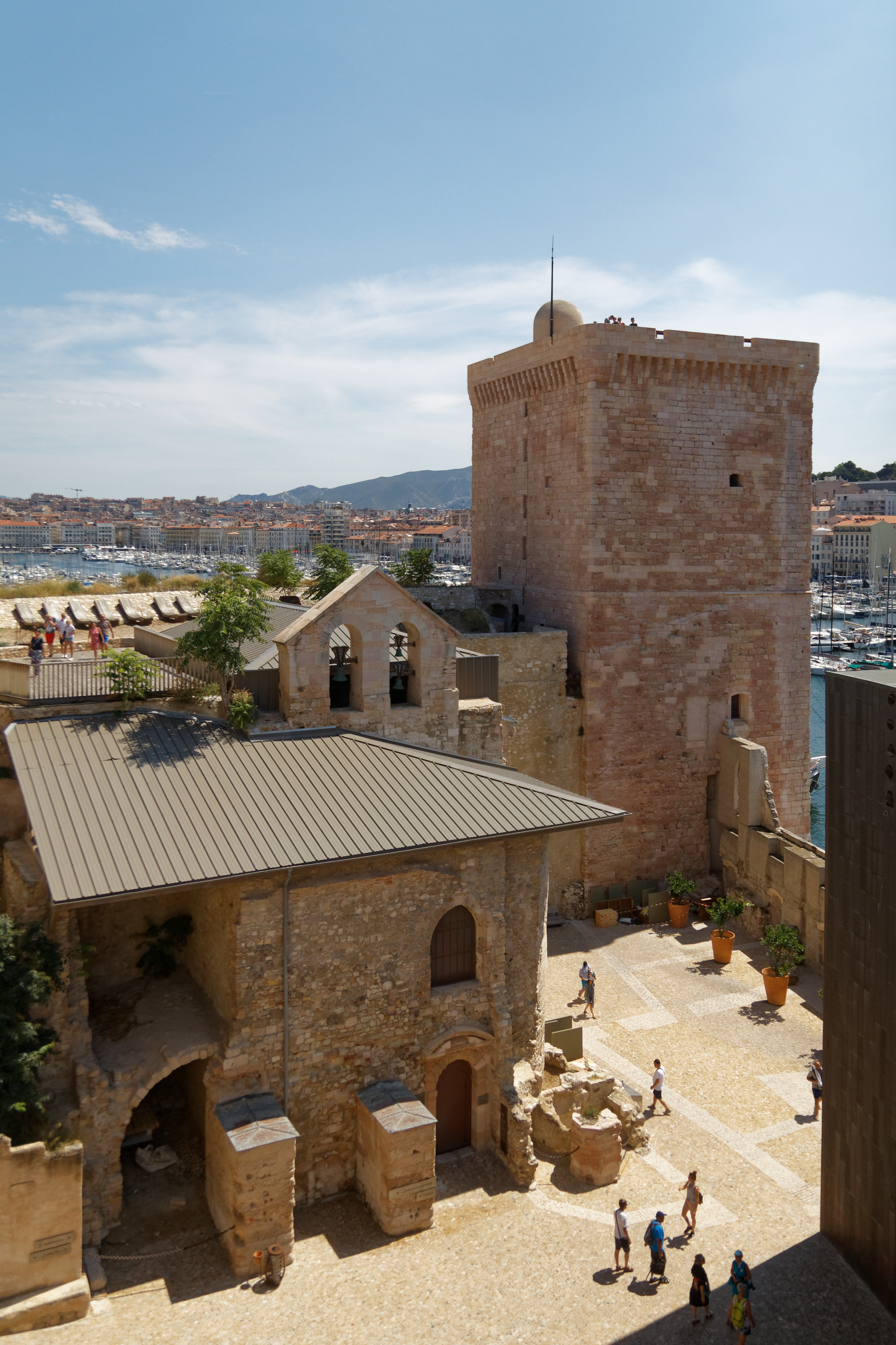

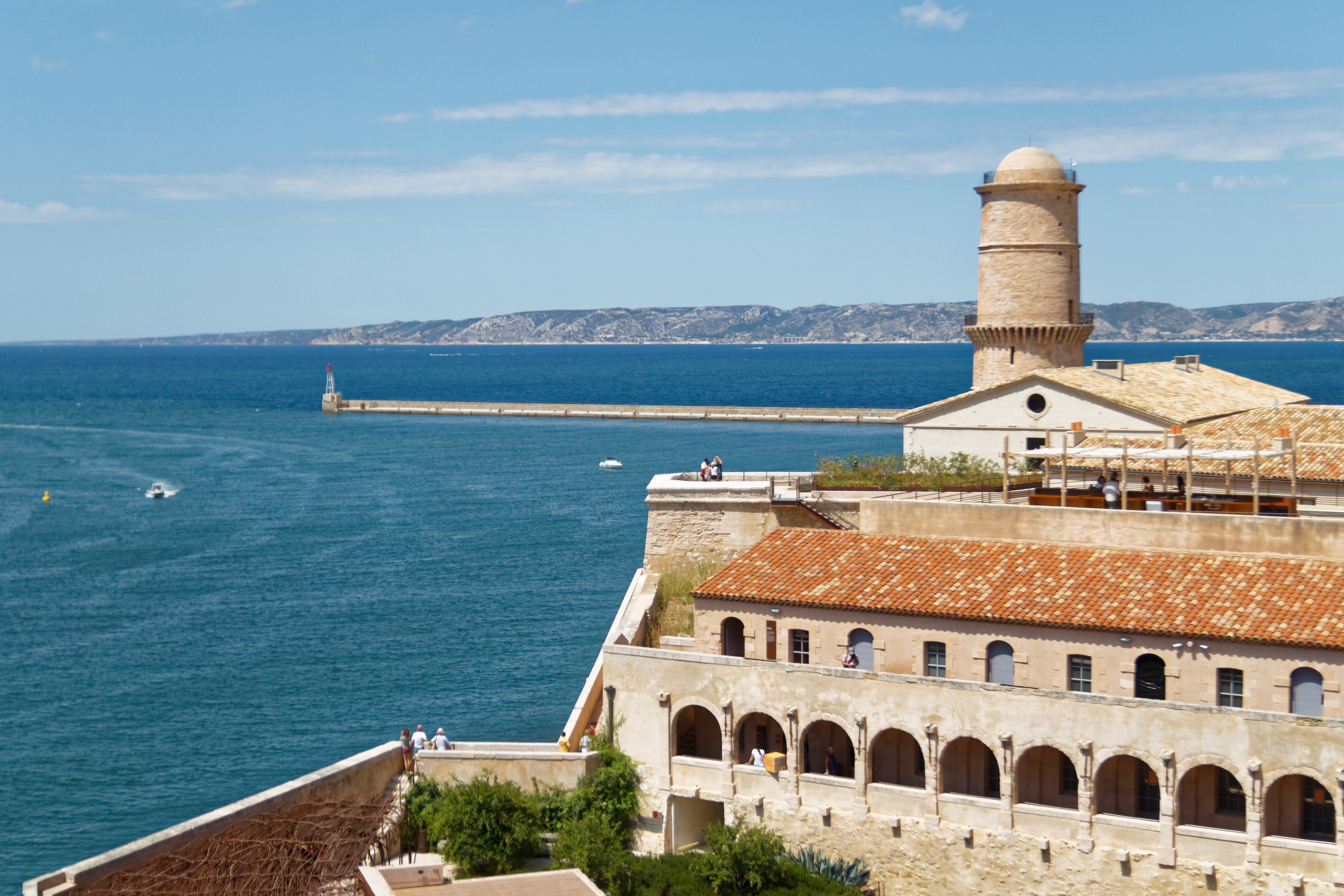

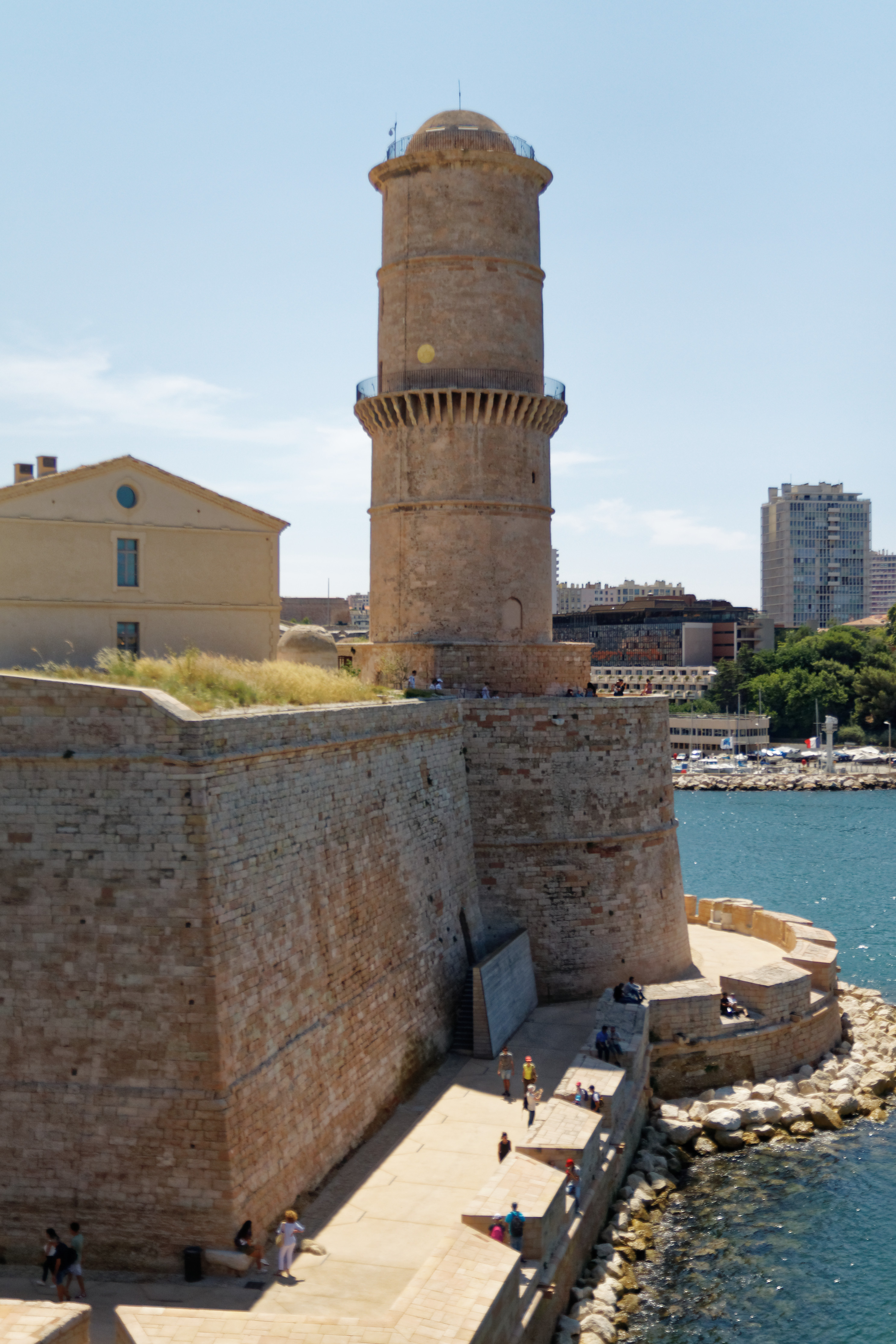

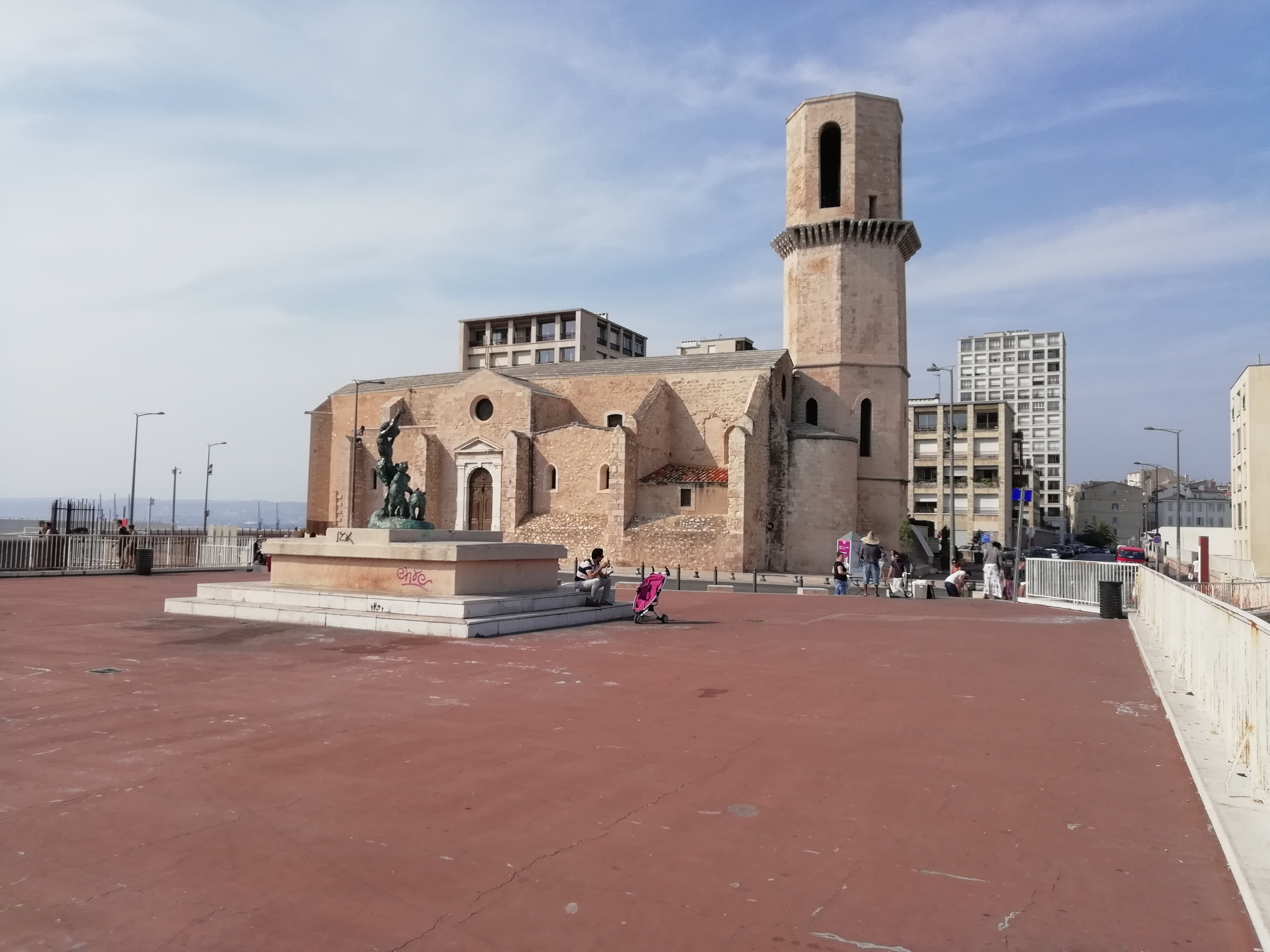

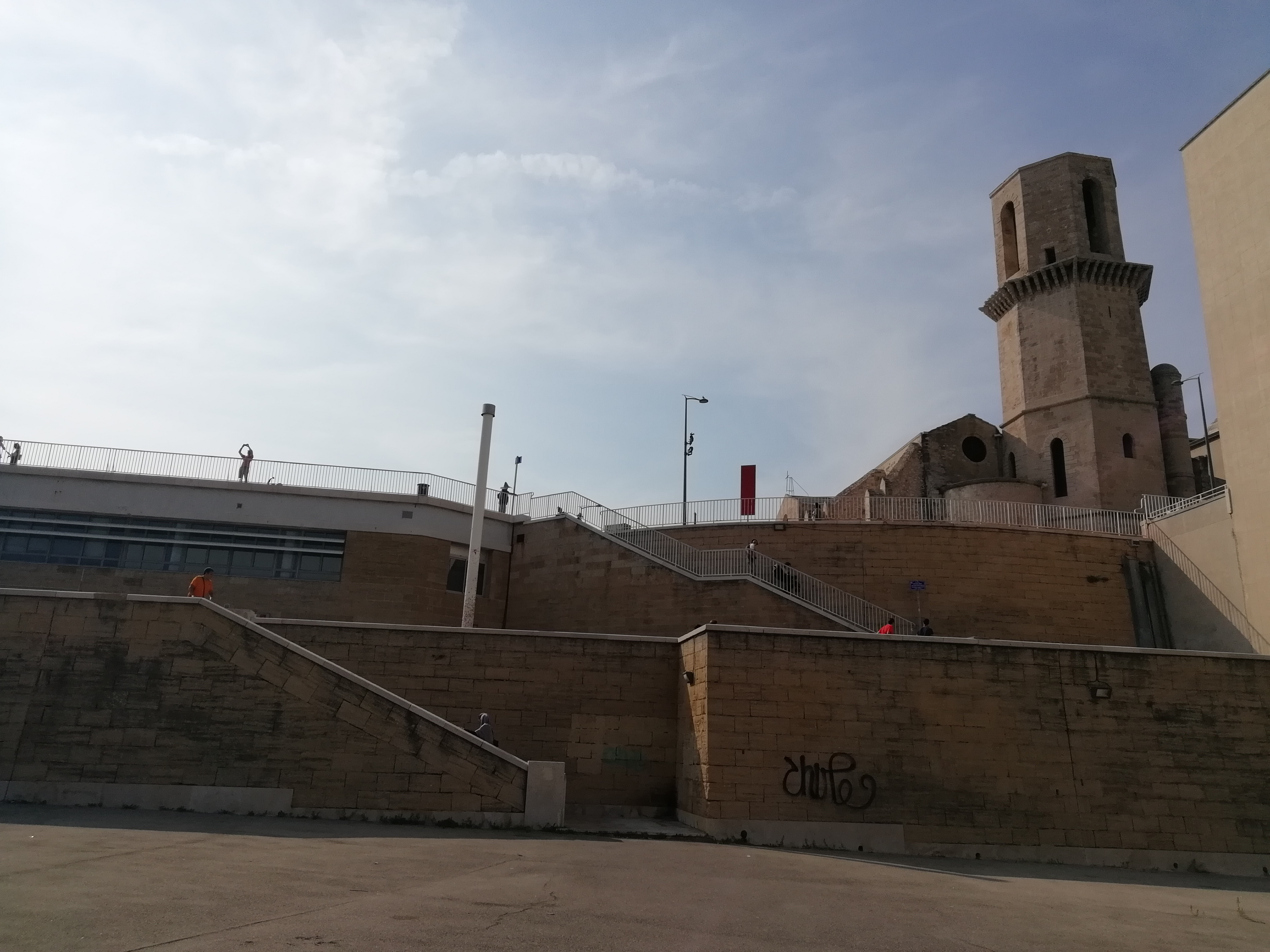
