= 2nd arrondissement of Marseille =

- Municipal arrondissement
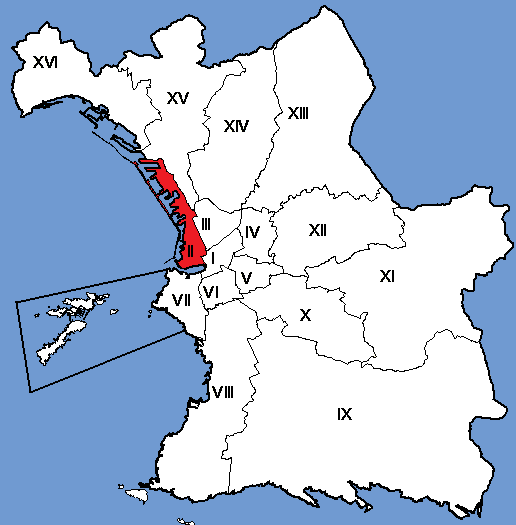
- Location within Marseille
- Interactive map of 2nd arrondissement of Marseille
- Coordinates: 43.2964°N 5.3696°E
- Country: France
- Region: Provence-Alpes-Côte d'Azur
- Department: Bouches-du-Rhône
- Commune: Marseille

Government
  - Mayor (2020–2026): Anthony Krehmeier (PS)
- Area: 5.04 km^{2} (1.95 sq mi)
- Population (2023): 24,378
  - Density: 4,840/km^{2} (12,500/sq mi)
- INSEE code: 13202

The 2nd arrondissement of Marseille is one of the 16 arrondissements of Marseille. It covers the northwestern part of the city centre and a large part of the Port of Marseille. It is governed locally together with the 3rd arrondissement, with which it forms the 2nd sector of Marseille.

Historical population
Year	Pop.	±% p.a.
1968	39,743	—
1975	32,974	−2.63%
1982	31,326	−0.73%
1990	26,801	−1.93%
1999	24,593	−0.95%
2007	25,779	+0.59%
2012	24,274	−1.20%
2017	24,810	+0.44%
2023	24,378	−0.29%
Source: INSEE

Neighbourhood	Population (2022)
Arenc	1,668
Les Grands Carmes	6,899
Hôtel de Ville	5,639
La Joliette	9,945

- Unemployment rate, as of 8/3/1999

Area	Workers	Number of unemployed	Unemployment rate
Arenc	593	218	36,76%
Les Grands Carmes	3 480	1 410	40,52%
Hôtel de Ville	2 884	860	29,82%
La Joliette	2 541	961	37,82%
Arrondissement	9 498	3 449	36,31%
Total Marseille	336 009	78 288	23,30%

- Dwellings in areas as of 8/3/1999

Neighbourhood	% Tenants	% Buildings	% 4 or more rooms
Arenc	64,05%	80,63%	28,10%
Les Grands Carmes	80,40%	94,98%	19,04%
Hôtel de Ville	65,74%	96,98%	16,07%
La Joliette	58,05%	95,86%	20,79%
Arrondissement	68,56%	95,17%	18,94%
Total Marseille	51,73%	82,86%	38,21%

- Population of neighbourhoods by age 8/3/1999

Neighbourhood	% 0-19	% 20-39	% 40-59	% 60-74	% 75 +
Arenc	25,32%	29,54%	26,44%	12,45%	6,26%
Les Grands Carmes	25,53%	27,62%	27,48%	12,59%	6,78%
Hôtel de Ville	14,66%	31,44%	23,76%	16,94%	13,20%
La Joliette	28,72%	26,86%	22,09%	13,29%	9,04%
Arrondissement	23,46%	28,56%	24,90%	13,96%	9,12%
Total Marseille	23,16%	28,67%	24,84%	14,18%	9,16%
