= Parco Biblioteca degli Alberi =

Public park in Porta Nuova, Milan, Italy

- BAM – Biblioteca degli Alberi Milano
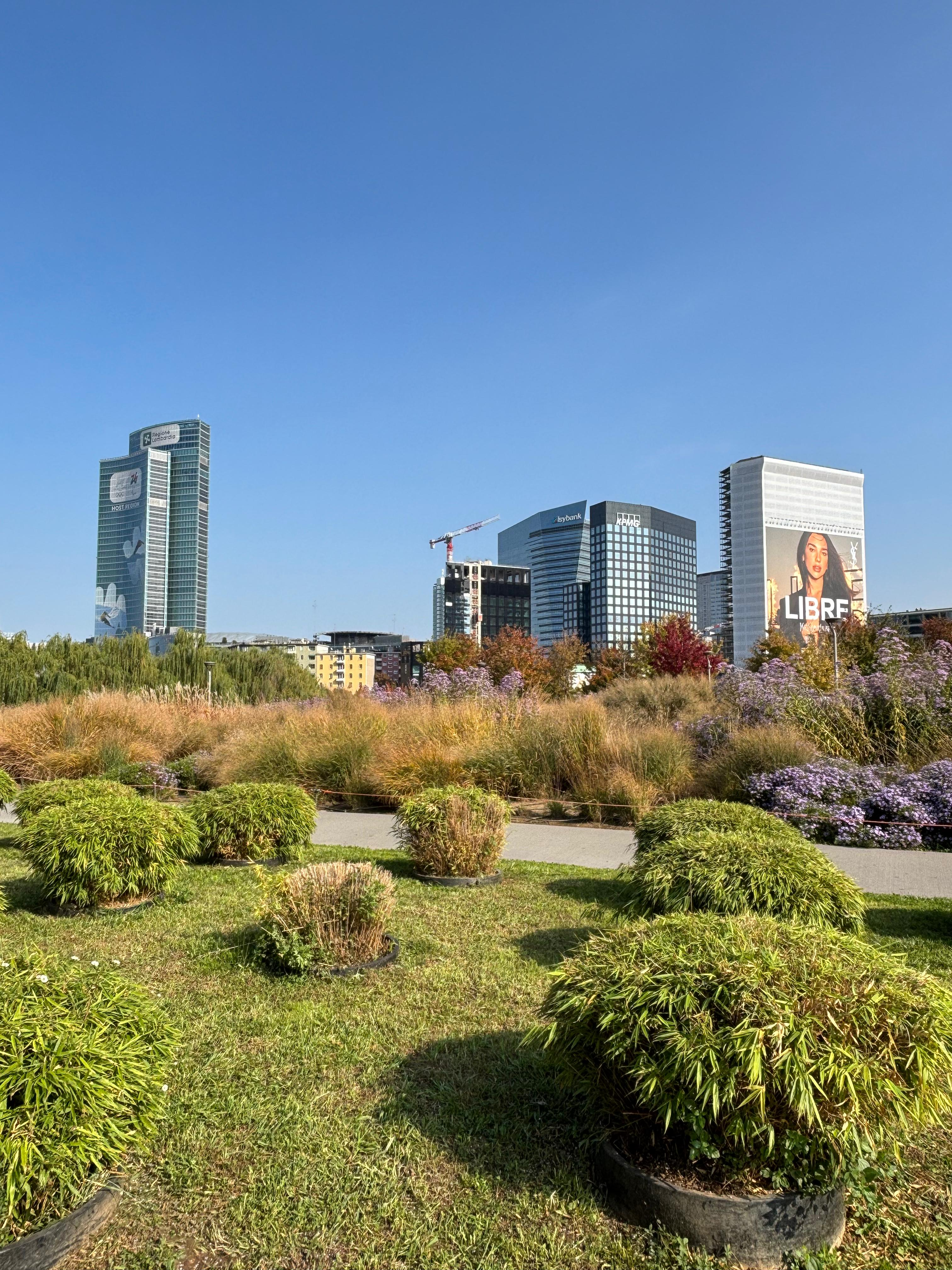
- The park in October 2025

- Location within Milan
- Type: Urban park; botanical garden
- Location: Porta Nuova, Milan, Italy
- Coordinates: 45.4838°N 9.1925°E
- Area: 10 ha (25 acres)
- Created: 27 October 2018
- Designer: Inside Outside (Petra Blaisse); Piet Oudolf (perennial gardens)
- Owner: Municipality of Milan
- Operator: Fondazione Riccardo Catella
- Open: Open 24 hours
- Status: Open
- Public transit: Milan Metro: Garibaldi FS (M2, M5), Isola (M5), Gioia (M2); Milano Porta Garibaldi railway station
- Website: bam.milano.it

Parco Biblioteca degli Alberi (lit. 'Library of Trees Park'), commonly known as BAM (Biblioteca degli Alberi Milano), is a public park and contemporary botanical garden in the Porta Nuova district of Milan, Italy. It lies between Piazza Gae Aulenti, Via Melchiorre Gioia, Via Gaetano de Castillia and Via Filippo Sassetti, on the border with the Isola neighbourhood. The park covers about 10 hectares (25 acres) and is the third-largest public park in central Milan, after Parco Sempione and the Giardini Pubblici Indro Montanelli.

The park occupies part of the former Porta Garibaldi railway yards, an area left largely inaccessible for decades. It was designed by the Dutch studio Inside Outside, led by Petra Blaisse, with the Milan-based Studio Giorgetta as local partner; the design won an international competition held by the Municipality of Milan in 2004 and was built between 2010 and 2018. The Dutch designer Piet Oudolf created the perennial gardens. Its name refers to the way the plants are arranged: species are grouped in distinct areas, like books on the shelves of a library. The park has no fences or gates and has been open around the clock since its inauguration on 27 October 2018.

BAM is owned by the Municipality of Milan, was built by the real estate company COIMA as part of the Porta Nuova development, and has been managed since 2019 by the Fondazione Riccardo Catella under a public–private agreement. The foundation is responsible for maintenance, security and a cultural programme of more than 300 events a year, most of them free. In 2024 the park received the Dubai International Best Practices Award for Sustainable Development from UN-Habitat in the category of urban regeneration and public spaces.

== Description ==
=== Layout ===
The design is based on a grid of irregular fields crossed by a network of footpaths that intersect at different angles. The paths connect Piazza Gae Aulenti with Isola, Via Melchiorre Gioia, the Varesine promenade and the gardens of Via de Castillia, linking parts of the city that the railway yards had kept apart. The fields between the paths have different uses: flowering meadows, beds of aromatic plants, open lawns, a fitness area inside a circle of sweetgums, a relaxation area with wooden chaise longues under the birches, a playground with swings of several sizes and a dog area. Step-free access is available from Via de Castillia, Piazza Gae Aulenti and the Passeggiata Veronelli. Short texts written by Milan residents are inscribed along the paths (see History).

The park forms part of a continuous pedestrian and cycling network that runs through Porta Nuova between the headquarters of the Lombardy Region, Piazza della Repubblica and Piazza XXV Aprile.

=== Botanical collection ===
The park contains about 500 trees of more than 100 species, arranged in 22 circular groves, and around 135,000 plants in total. The groves include hornbeams, ash trees, sweetgums and a circle of ornamental apple trees. Other areas host aromatic plants, a flowering meadow, a grass meadow and a small pond.

=== Fauna ===
The variety of habitats supports insects, birds and waterbirds such as ducks. The pond is the richest habitat for birds: the common moorhen arrived on its own while the park was still closed to the public and has returned to nest every year since. The rose garden was planted specifically to feed pollinators, and the park's trees have been fitted with sensors to study their environmental role (see Ecology and research).

=== Rose garden ===
The Roseto di BAM – Oasi degli Insetti e delle Farfalle (lit. 'BAM Rose Garden – Oasis of Insects and Butterflies') opened in March 2025 on a previously fenced-off area at the edge of the park. Designed by the architects Franco Giorgetta and Gloria Montini, it holds more than 120 rose plants of five species and 85 varieties, among them the "Rosa di BAM", a cultivar hybridised for the park by the Barni nursery of Pistoia. The beds around the roses contain 17 nectar and host plants chosen to feed pollinators, especially solitary bees. Two insect hotels stand at either end of the garden; their design was chosen through a public competition won by a second-grade class of the Istituto Confalonieri, a primary school in Milan. The project was developed with a scientific committee that included the entomologist Gianumberto Accinelli.

The rose garden was also designed for accessibility. Together with the associations L'abilità, the Ente Nazionale Sordi and the Istituto Nazionale per la Mobilità Autonoma di Ciechi e Ipovedenti (INMACI), the park installed ramps, a tactile path with maps for blind and partially sighted visitors, a video in Italian Sign Language and two guides for people with cognitive disabilities.

== History ==
=== Before the park ===
For much of the 20th century the area was occupied by the Porta Garibaldi railway yards, which separated the Isola district from the city centre. The nearby Varesine area hosted the tents of travelling circuses, including those of the Togni and Orfei families. After the yards were decommissioned, the land remained empty and closed to the public for more than fifty years. At the park's opening, the mayor of Milan, Giuseppe Sala, described it as the moment the old Varesine area finally gave way to Porta Nuova.

In 2004 the Municipality of Milan held an international design competition, "Giardini di Porta Nuova – area Garibaldi Repubblica", which was won by Inside Outside with a design first developed in 2003. In 2015, during Expo 2015, the Fondazione Riccardo Catella and the Fondazione Nicola Trussardi invited the American artist Agnes Denes, with the support of Confagricoltura, to recreate in Milan her 1982 work Wheatfield – A Confrontation. The five-hectare field of wheat grew from March to July 2015 on the land where the park would later be built and was harvested on 9 July. Around 5,000 people took part in the project. During construction, residents took part in collective planting days and urban gardening workshops under the name MiColtivo nel parco, and more than 500 people entered #PercorsiPoetici, a competition for short texts about nature; the winning entries were inscribed on the park's paths.

=== Opening and management ===
The park was built by COIMA as an infrastructure obligation of the Porta Nuova urban project. The whole project cost about €14 million, and maintenance was estimated at a minimum of €3 million a year. It was inaugurated on 27 October 2018. On 5 July 2019 the Municipality of Milan, COIMA SGR and the Fondazione Riccardo Catella signed an agreement assigning the foundation the maintenance, security and programming of what the agreement calls Milan's third public park. The municipality remains the owner, and access remains free and unrestricted.

The foundation funds the park's upkeep and programme through sponsorships, grants, corporate partners and "Park Ambassadors", as well as a community programme for residents called BAMFRIEND.

=== Later developments ===
The rose garden, built on a previously enclosed strip of land, opened on 30 March 2025. In 2024 the park won the UN-Habitat Dubai International Best Practices Award for Sustainable Development, chosen from about 2,600 entries from 144 countries.

== Cultural programme ==
The Fondazione Riccardo Catella organises a programme of more than 300 events a year in the park, almost all of them free. The programme follows the seasons: dance in spring, music in summer, theatre and poetry in autumn, and light installations in winter. The park has no permanent venue, so performances are staged in different areas of the garden.

Recurring events include BAM Circus, a festival of contemporary circus and street theatre. The festival takes its theme from the area's history as a circus ground. The foundation also runs projects outside the park, in Milan's outer districts and in other Italian cities. In 2026, before a free open-air performance of Tchaikovsky's The Sleeping Beauty, it organised workshops based on the music in schools, community centres and the Beccaria juvenile prison.

== Ecology and research ==
The park has hosted several research projects on urban greenery. The first project of Prospettiva Terra, a network of companies, scientists and non-profit organisations founded by the plant neurobiologist Stefano Mancuso and the advertising executive Marco Girelli, was presented at Palazzo Marino in April 2024. Some 300 Internet of Things sensors, developed by Mancuso and PNAT, a spin-off of the University of Florence, were placed on as many trees for 18 months. They measured carbon storage, the removal of fine particulate matter and each tree's stability, assessed by recording how it sways over time. The data were processed with machine-learning models to predict tree failures, an approach the researchers proposed as a tool for making urban trees safer. The project had the patronage of the Municipality of Milan and was funded by companies including McDonald's, Henkel and Ricola.

The park's managers have adapted its planting to climate change. Drier areas have been replanted with species that need less water, and the lawns are allowed to turn golden in high summer rather than being kept green.

== Recognition ==
- 2024 – Dubai International Best Practices Award for Sustainable Development (UN-Habitat), category "Urban Regeneration and Public Spaces"
- The park is a member of the Grandi Giardini Italiani network.

== See also ==
- Bosco Verticale
- High Line
- List of parks in Milan
- Porta Nuova (Milan)
