= Lombard pre-unitarian industry =

Industry in Lombardy before the Unification of Italy

Lombard pre-unitarian industry refers to the characteristics and development of industry in the Lombard provinces from its founding to the Unification of Italy. Industry in Lombardy was born and developed from the early 19th century largely on private initiative, as opposed to elsewhere where industry was encouraged by the various governments through direct intervention or massive state orders. This feature, together with the lack of a favorable customs and industrial policy under the dependencies of the Austrian Empire, on which Lombardy depended, allowed local industry to strengthen over the years until it led Italian industrial development with the Unification of Italy.

== Introduction ==
The beginning of Lombard industry, understood as a concentration of labor and fragmented tasks often carried out with the aid of machinery, can be dated to the first half of the 18th century, when the Innocente Osnago silk factory was founded in Milan in 1736, where a few years later 50 Jacquard looms were in operation, employing about 300 people. Another less supported hypothesis dates the first modern Lombard factory to 1704 with the founding of the Tieffen woolen mill where workers worked with machinery imported from Flanders and France. However, the phenomenon of industrialization remained fairly marginal until the end of the 1700s, yet the main type of industry, with textiles predominating over others, persisted throughout the next century. According to Cesare Cantù, the first serious effort at industrialization in Lombardy occurred during the Napoleonic reign, in which the need to arm an army of about 50000 individuals gave the first major boost to the mechanical and textile industries.

While the Napoleonic Wars are referred to as the starting point for industrialization of a certain magnitude, according to Giovanni Merlini Lombardy's industrial development began in 1815 with the cessation of the state of war in Europe, causing industrial growth that lasted until 1847, when according to Merlini Lombardy's industry reached the peak of its prosperity. The uprisings of '48 in fact brought instability to the territory and took arms away from industry, however the situation persisted in the years to follow given the imposition of a military government that passed many ordinances that would significantly limit the growth of Lombard industries.

== Textile industry ==
The textile industry was certainly by value and employment the most profitable and important branch of Lombard industry. The most important branch of the textile industry was silk, among the most developed in Europe, followed by cotton and then all the others.

=== Silk industry ===
The art of spinning and weaving was already active in Lombardy in the 1300s. To a century later date the laws of Gian Galeazzo Maria Sforza who, in order to encourage silk production, imposed on all landowners the planting of a certain number of mulberry trees, a plant on which silkworms fed.

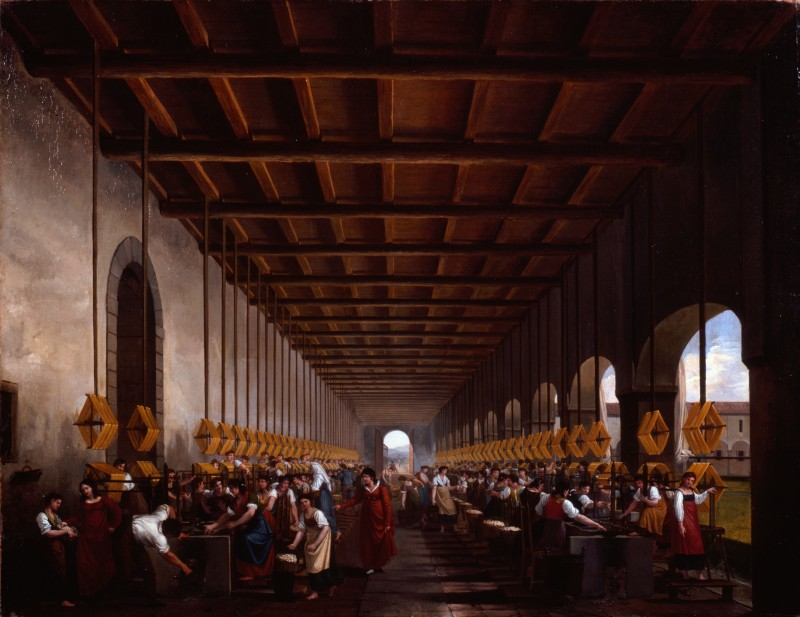
Pietro Ronzoni - Spinning mill in the Bergamo area (c. 1820).

At the dawn of Italian unification (1860) Lombardy produced just over 1400 tons of raw silk yarn out of the Italian total of 4200 tons (about a third of all production): followed by the Kingdom of Sardinia with about 900 tons, then Veneto with about 700 tons and the Kingdom of the Two Sicilies with just under 600 tons; the remaining 600 tons were supplied by the remaining Italian states.

Of all the textile industries, the silk industry was for a long time the most important in Lombardy: local silk yarn production as of 1856 was about 4 million Milanese pounds, or about 1,300 tons per year, supplying about 70 percent of the total silk trade in Lombardy, to which was added yarn from the Veneto or other Austrian provinces, for a total of about 1870 tons traded or processed in Lombardy. Of all this, only a little over 20 percent was for domestic trade, while the rest was exported throughout Europe. Export took place even if to a small extent already from silk cocoons, with a total production of about 14500 tons of which 200 were exported and another 200 were used for silkworm breeding. The remaining cocoons in Lombardy were processed by an approximate number of 3100 spinning mills, of which 144 were steam-powered, for a total of 40000 reels: just under 80000 typically female employees worked in the aforementioned spinning mills, however most of the spinning mills were active full-time for only 60 days a year.

Of the raw silk produced about one-seventh was exported in the raw state, while the rest underwent at least one processing before being put on the market. After spinning, the silk had to undergo twisting in the 525 spinning mills out of about 530000 spindles: the total number of workers in the factories regularly operating almost all year round was about 35000 workers. Then followed the manufacture of silk fabrics: this was almost totally concentrated between the provinces of Como and Milan and had 141 factories for 3400 looms, of which 835 at Jacquard, employing about 7500 individuals.

Finally, there were two silk cocoon waste processing factories in Milan and Bergamo for 1500 spindles producing approximately 800 tons per year of silk waste. Although the data refer to 1856, the Manifattura Vercellone with its 140 workers was already known in this sector in 1840. In the Bergamo area, spinning mills took advantage of the exploitation begun in 1804 of the lignite deposit at Leffe, a fuel that had advantages over the wood normally used for boiling water for yarns and drying them.

=== Cotton industry ===
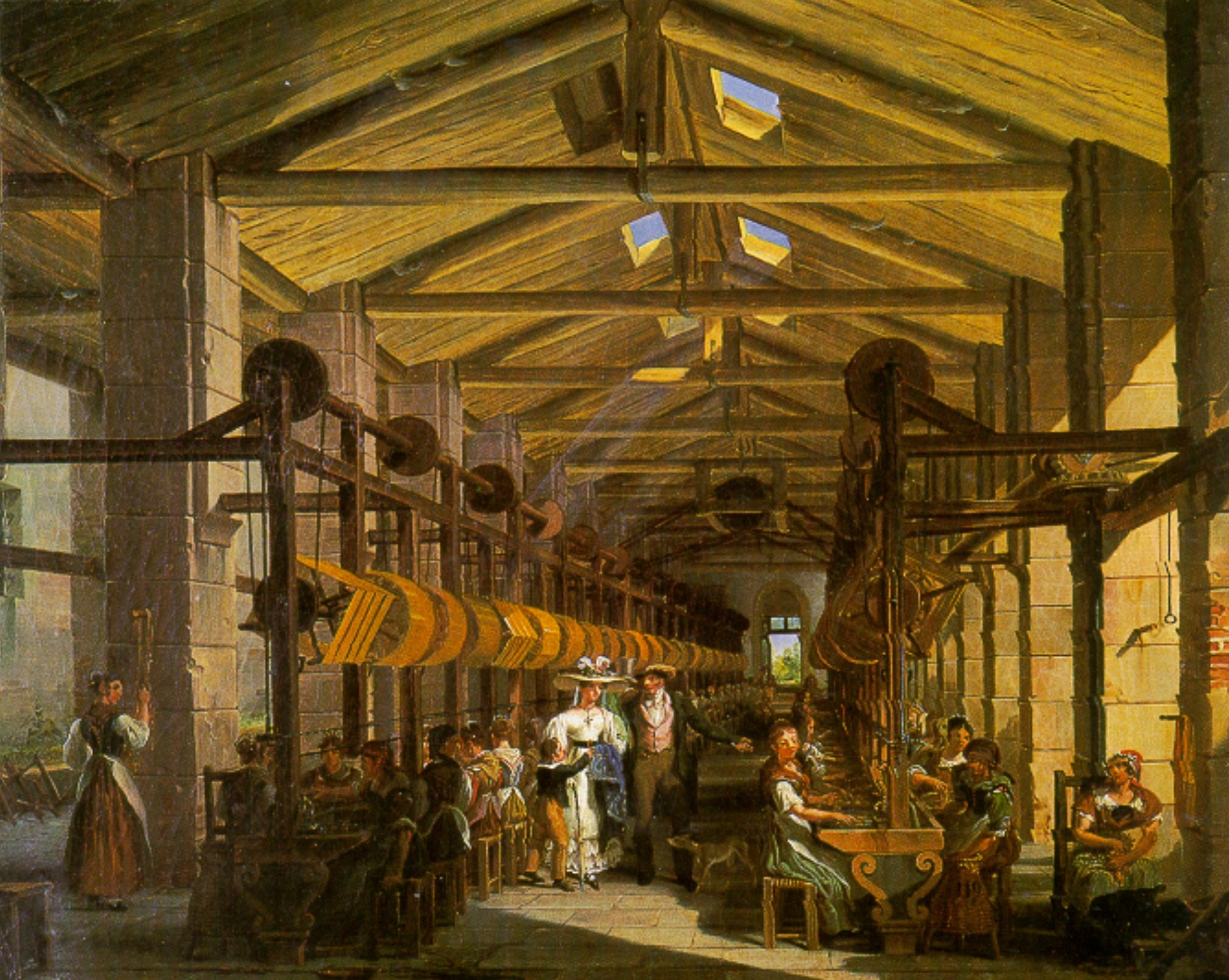
The Mylius spinning mill by Giovanni Migliara, 1828. This painting was commissioned by Enrico Mylius from the painter to illustrate his Boffalora spinning mill.

Much of the raw cotton was imported from the United States, with the remainder coming from India and Egypt. Of all the imported cotton, three-quarters was destined for processing in Lombard factories. There were 33 spinning mills in the region and a total of 123000 spindles, with 18 factories and 70000 spindles in the province of Milan and 9 factories and 30000 in the province of Como. In the province of Milan, spinning mills were particularly concentrated in the Altomilanese area, where the factories could draw water from the Olona and Ticino rivers necessary for the motive power of the machinery, while there was only one factory in Chiavenna, in the province of Sondrio, which, however, equaled the 3 factories in the province of Bergamo in number of spindles.

The Lombard factories in total processed 3300 tons of cotton, to which must be added about 240 tons of waste. As for employment, 3810 workers were employed in cotton spinning, among the main factories can be found:

- Cotonificio Ponti in Solbiate Olona, it had 400 workers and 11000 spindles, for 450 tons of cotton processed
- Cotonificio Cantoni in Legnano, it had 257 workers and 5000 spindles, for about 120 tons of processed cotton
- Cotonificio Krumm of Legnano, it had 230 workers and 8100 spindles, for 200 tons of processed cotton
- Cotonificio Fumagalli e Stucchi of Peregallo, it had 226 workers and 8800 spindles, for 180 tons of processed cotton
- Cotonificio De Planta and Corradino in Chiavenna, it had 213 workers and 8500 spindles, for 240 tons of processed cotton

The rest of the factories were organized in smaller concentrations of 200 workers, averaging 115 per factory, while there were numerous factories that while employing fewer workers had higher yarn production. The average stood at about 100 tons of spun cotton per factory: others included the Cotonificio Candiani (131 t), Cotonificio Ferrario e Ottolini (138 t), Cotonificio Zuppinger (174 t), Cotonificio Crespi (157 t), and Cotonificio Schoch (138 t). There are reports in 1840 of the Cremella Cotton Mill with 210 workers.

As for cotton weaving, there were just over 17,000 looms in Lombardy as of 1856, of which 15,000 were in the province of Milan alone: the 100 or so Jacquard looms were all located in the province of Milan. Those employed in weaving amounted to about 34000 people, who were, however, drawn during the periods of inactivity of the peasants, the activity of weaving not being carried on throughout the year. Painting and printing of cotton fabrics was also present: the most important establishment in this field was certainly the Cavalli Printed Cotton Factory, which had more than 400 workers in 1840.

=== Other textile industries ===
Industrial wool processing was introduced in Lombardy in 1816, while traditional wool processing was already present in the time of Francesco Sforza. In the early years of industrialization there was an attempt at large-scale introduction of the wool industry: two “grandiose” factories were founded in those years in Milan and Como: in particular, the Lanificio Guaita in Como, capable of employing up to 700 workers, is remembered. As early as 1840 the large-scale adventure of wool production in Lombardy could be said to have ended, mainly due to high duties on the import of raw material and competition from wool mills in more favored areas of the Austrian Empire of which Lombardy was a part, particularly Bohemia and Moravia. By 1856 wool spinning was particularly concentrated in the province of Bergamo, where there were 6 spinning mills for 4300 spindles: spun wool production stood at 750 tons. There were also 27 wool cloth factories and 30 carpet factories in the Bergamo area, whose goods were exported to the Duchy of Modena and Reggio, the Papal States, the Kingdom of the Two Sicilies, Hungary and Turkey. However, in Lombardy-Veneto the wool industry had developed greatly in the Schio district, to which was added competition from the Borgosesia district in neighboring Piedmont.

Linen processing was organized in medium to large factories, and flax needed for domestic consumption was produced there. Total production stood at just under 1,300 tons. Among the factories were:

- Linificio di Cassano d'Adda, with 400 workers employed and a total yarn of 600 tons
- Linificio di Villa d'Almè that employed 375 people for a total yarn of 430 tons
- Linificio di Melegnano with about 2100 spindles, more than 200 workers employed and a total yarn of 133 tons of linen
- Archinto Linen Mill in Vaprio d'Adda, employing more than 300 workers

As for weaving, industrial-type activity was entirely marginal, with the presence of 100 looms throughout Lombardy. More significant, on the other hand, was the handicraft-type activity, with about 14,000 looms scattered throughout the agricultural areas of the lower Po Valley.

Derived from the textile industry was the dyehouse industry, that is, where fabrics were dyed, where more than 1,800 tons of fabrics were processed annually, 230 of which were silk alone. Finally, about 2,000 people were employed in hat factories of various types.

== Machine industry ==
=== Iron and steel industry ===
Lombardy, together with the Grand Duchy of Tuscany, was responsible for the manufacture of more than two-thirds of the cast iron produced in all the Italian preunitarian states just before Unification, which stood at about 30000 tons: this figure gives an idea of the primordial state at which the Italian iron and steel industry was, when in 1855 England alone produced 3000000 tons.

Among the largest and most famous industries in pre-unification Lombardy was certainly the Rubini ironworks in Dongo. Founded in the 18th century, in an area where iron was mined from local mines, it was the focus of a renovation by engineer Falck, a technician called from Alsace in 1840 to improve production. Among the main innovations the following are worth noting:

- Installation in 1840 of the first “English-style” blast furnace (i.e., of circular cross-section and not square as in use until now in Italy) in the Italian peninsula and consequent doubling of the typical height: this first measure, which soon after spread throughout the surrounding area, made it possible to reduce coal consumption by 55%.
- Introduction in 1842 of one of the first puddling furnaces with an oxidizing flame generated in a separate chamber from the cast iron chamber: this measure allowed a further 33% fuel saving and a 10% reduction in ferrous waste material.

Such savings in fuel were most welcome in a context such as Lombardy and Italy, given the scarcity of coal deposits, which then had to be imported with the consequent costs. The Alsatian technician's measures ultimately brought the ironworks in just under 20 years to the top of the Italian steel industry, with an output of about 1,000 tons of cast iron by 1858 (up from 420 tons in 1840) and 400 workers permanently employed at the plant.

Noting engineer Falck's excellent work, the Badoni family, owners of the Badoni e C. firm, called the Alsatian engineer to their plants, which included three factories located in what is now the province of Lecco, in Bellano, Castello and Mandello. The engineer, who arrived in 1850, introduced measures already tried in the Dongo ironworks, plus other innovations that had never been tried, including:

- Use of reverberatory furnaces and peat as fuel
- Installation of the first rolling mill train moved by hydraulic power in Italy
- Modernization of wire processing with use of coils

By the end of the 1950s, the company was producing 1,300 tons of cast iron, all of which was destined for further processing within the company, placing it at the top of pre-unification Italian steelmaking.

The other pole of Lombard steelmaking, smaller in terms of the average size of its forges but responsible for about two-thirds of total steel production, was the area around Valcamonica, which had already been a site of ferrous material production for centuries. The first smelting shops in the late mid-1940s were counting in 16 smelting furnaces: in what was the period of maximum metallurgical production before the unification of Italy, the districts of the provinces of Brescia and Bergamo came to manufacture about 8,000 tons of cast iron a year. Subsequently, the raw materials produced were processed in 122 major forges where a total of 5300 tons of semi-finished metal products were processed as of the second half of the 1950s.

Although the area was at the forefront of the metallurgical sector in Lombardy and Italy, the technological progress of the workshops was still far from the average European level, yet there were some exceptions, among which it is worth mentioning:

- Officine Gregorini in Lovere: among the leading metallurgical workshops in the province of Bergamo, as of 1857 it employed 500 workers and had a production of 200 tons of wrought iron, 100 tons of steel and 60 tons of springs. The plant had a rapid and prosperous development due to the adoption of modern techniques used in Europe, such as the introduction in Italy of the first Siemens furnace for the conversion of cast iron.

The manufacture and processing of iron in these provinces was, however, benefited by the presence of non-negligible mines: throughout the first half of the 19th century, an average of 6,000 to 7,000 tons of iron ore was extracted from local mines, which, however, was not enough to feed all the furnaces in the area.

=== Metalworking industry ===
The metal-mechanical production department was organized on small and medium-sized workshops when compared with major workshops in other countries; the reason was due to three main reasons:

- Absence of a favorable industrial policy on the part of the Austrian central state, where in contrast other states saw the establishment of large state-owned machine shops that would benefit from large and continuous commissions, as happened with Ansaldo of Genoa for the Kingdom of Sardinia and Officine di Pietrarsa for the Kingdom of the Two Sicilies.
- The Austrian central government's favoring of its local manufactures in state commissions, as was the case, for example, in the mechanical sector with most of the public orders to Styrian workshops and the absence of duties in various areas such as in the import of machinery from France and England.
- Concentration, for obvious geographical reasons, of large shipbuilding in Venice and Trieste, where there were the Venetian Arsenal and the Lloyd Arsenal, among the largest mechanical factories in the Italian peninsula.Iron produced in Lombardy was almost entirely used for further processing in workshops within the region. By 1858 there were 17 primary factories, the largest of which were all located in Milan, except for one in Como:
- Officine meccaniche Grondona: it was founded in 1847 by a family of carriage makers as a railway carriage factory. Four years after its founding it had 160 workers and was described by the Eco della Borsa as follows, "The wagon workshops are so vast, that their width includes frames of beams 23 braces long [...]." By 1860 the factory came to employ 280 workers.
- Workshops for the repair of rolling stock at Porta Nuova Station and Porta Tosa Station, which were functional for the young Lombardo-Veneto railway network, employed more than 100 workers each in the mid-1850s. By 1862, the staff of the first of the two workshops would rise to 350.
- Officine Elvetica, founded in 1846 as Officine Bouffier, employed up to 400 workers by 1850. It was organized into two workshops, with a total of more than a hundred machines, including 3 steam engines, 4 cast iron furnaces, 7 cranes, and 50 lathes. It produced steam boilers, agricultural machinery and water turbines, among others. On its facilities Breda would be founded a few decades later.
- Officine Schlegel, in 1853 employed 350 people, and produced tools and machinery of various types: to give an idea of the growth the industry was experiencing, in 1851 the same workshops employed a workforce of 200 people.
- Officine Regazzoni in Como: employed 120 workers as of 1857 and was also active in shipbuilding, supplying the demand for boats from Lake Como.

Finally, the Officine fratelli Ballaydier established in Milan in 1844 after the two brothers had successfully opened a factory for the production of steam boilers in Genoa, and the firm Suffert Edoardo founded in 1852, again for the production of boilers and water wheels, are worth mentioning.

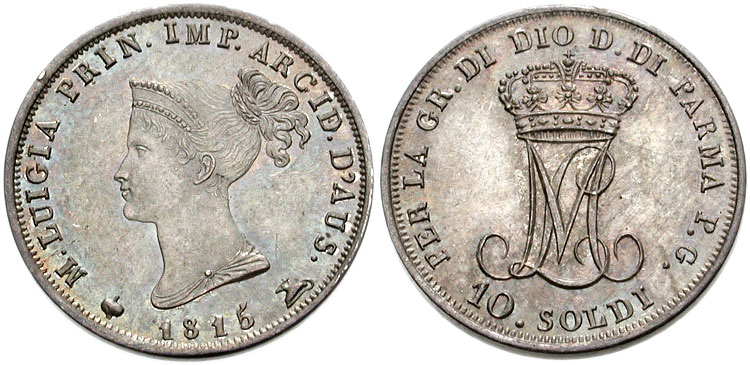
10 soldi of Maria Luigia minted at the Milan mint (1815).

A particularly prolific branch of the Lombard metalworking industry, concentrated in Milan, was the manufacture of carriages. The city had 40 factories from which carriages came out: one in particular is mentioned, the Cesare Sala carriage factory, referred to as “of such importance that there is perhaps no one to equal it in all of Italy.” A number of smaller factories existed in the other cities, whose importance was quite marginal when compared to production in the capital. In the city of Milan, employees in the factories amounted to about 2,500: the Milanese factories supplied all of northern Italy and the provinces of the Austrian Empire. The quality of this industry's products was affected by the marginal development of Italian metallurgy, which forced carriage manufacturers to turn to foreign suppliers for mechanical parts, such as springs and axles, for higher quality carriages.

Also belonging to the branch of the metalworking industry was the I.R. Zecca di Milano: described as one of the best mints in Europe for the quality of its workmanship, it possessed a vast mechanical workshop with 14 balancers for minting coins, 8 of which were hydraulically operated, plus various hammers, rolling mills, scrapers and other machinery, again driven by hydraulic power. Such a workshop was capable of employing up to 200 people during peak production periods.

=== War industry ===
The war industry was at the beginning of the 19th century one of the first pushes toward industrialization that until then seemed not to take off: the demand for armaments, armor and uniforms for soldiers acted as a driving force for what would be the main sectors of Lombard industry in the decades to follow. At the end of the 1830s a particularly active sector in the area around Gardone was that of rifle manufacturing: on average 15,000 rifles were made per year in a variety of workshops employing a total of more than 400 people. After the uprisings of 1848 this sector was severely restricted by the Austrian authorities: this led to the halving of employees in the area who became involved in the manufacture of similar objects for non-war functions. To the 14 forges present before '48 in the territory, the I.R. factory in Gardone should be added, which alone employed more than 200 workers and could produce up to 6,000 rifles a month, and being of state dependence did not cease production.

Still related to the war industry, Ignazio Cantù described among the most important factories in Milan the military furnaces located in the suburb of Porta Nuova and the powder magazine in Lambrate founded in 1830.

=== Processing of other metals ===
The manufacture of bronze objects employed in Milan about a hundred people, largely concentrated in the Manfredini foundry. Founded as the Barigozzi foundry at Napoleon's behest as a bell factory, its most famous work was certainly the monumental complex of statues placed above the Arco della Pace: consisting of about 63 tons of cast bronze, the work was described at the time as "one of the most colossal ensembles in this kind of work" and "in the grandiose kind [...], which make the Arco del Sempione in Milan one of the most marvelous monuments of modern times." The foundry also achieved some fame outside Lombardy: from Piedmont came the commission for the equestrian statue of Charles Albert of Savoy currently in Casale Monferrato.

Also in Milan was a single large factory, Dita Izar, which made objects in silver alloys.

== Other industries ==
=== Papermaking, printing and related industries ===
As of 1856 there were 70 active printing factories in Lombardy, 38 of which were in the province of Milan, to which was added the Imperial Regia Stamperia. In the province of Milan, there were 35 active establishments in the capital city, to which 2 establishments in Monza and 1 in Gallarate had to be added, for a total of about 200 presses and 470 workers in their service, to which should be added the more than 200 of the I.R. Stamperia. The presses came manufactured from the 2 factories located in Milan and 1 in Monza, for a production of about 30 presses per year that allowed their export to the states of central and northern Italy: to this activity must be added 7 factories for the production of printing characters. Finally, in the city of Milan there were 30 chalcography factories and 13 lithography factories out of the 16 in the whole of Lombardy: among the main lithography factories the Vassalli brothers lithography with 12 presses and 45 workers employed is worth mentioning.

A separate discourse should be made for the 4 Milanese music printing plants and its 400 workers, which made the city one of the European reference points for this industry due to the conspicuous musical and operatic activity there. The most important of all was the Ricordi plant: in 1856 with 26,000 editions and about 200 workers, it was Europe's largest music publisher, far outdistancing the Schott AG plant in Mainz, which with 14,000 editions was Europe's second largest publisher. Overall, music production was lower than that of the cities of Paris, London and Vienna; however, compared to the number of inhabitants of the cities, Milan's production appeared the most conspicuous. Editions from the factories were shipped all over the world: throughout South America and Europe, Russia, Asia to Izmir and Africa to Alexandria, and of course all over Italy. The only Italian state excluded from the music trade was the Kingdom of the Two Sicilies, as due to the lack of reciprocal treaties, music shipped there could be counterfeited and sent back for illegal trade in other Italian states.

Connected to all these industries was the flourishing paper industry: there were a total of 90 paper factories, of which 35 were in the province of Brescia, 28 in the municipalities of Toscolano and Maderno alone, still famous today for being part of the “valley of the paper mills,” and 26 in that of Como. The most important paper mills were those in Vaprio d'Adda and Varese, described as “grand” for the time: altogether they employed 2,000 employees daily. The Vaprio paper mill employed 310 workers only in actual paper operations and had an output of 3200 kg of paper per day.

=== Ceramic and glass industry ===
Of no small importance was the porcelain, majolica and glass manufacturing industry. The most famous was certainly the Richard Ceramics Factory, the predecessor of Richard-Ginori, which as of 1855 included more than 300 workers and produced all kinds of ceramics and glass. The factory's main output at the time had a turnover of about 600,000 liras: production was exported to all Italian states at the time, Switzerland and Dalmatia. As for the majolica industry, there were 32 factories in the Lombardy provinces, 10 of which were concentrated in the province of Brescia: employees in the industry numbered about 600 excluding the Richard factory. While some factors such as the abundance of raw materials such as clay and other chemicals in Lombardy favored production in the region, competition from the nearby Piedmontese factories in Biella and Veneto in Vicenza, as well as imports of English and French products considered finer, definitely increased competition. The 4 factories in the province of Milan were concentrated in the Martesana district: the most important was in Cassano d'Adda which came to employ as of 1855 just under 200 men for the production of about 1200000 pieces at a time when the industry was in crisis. The manufacture of terracotta products was carried out by 8 factories in the province of Milan, plus several in the other provinces, although less significant and not specialized in terracotta alone: the largest was devoted to the manufacture of bricks near the Naviglio Grande and employed 290 workers. Particularly widespread in the province of Mantua was the manufacture and processing of bricks, which represented, according to the chronicles of the time, “perhaps the most characteristic industrial activity of the Mantuan area.”

Regarding the manufacture of glass, there were 4 factories active in Lombardy, concentrated in the lake areas, in Fiumelatte, Porlezza (2 factories) and Porto Valtravaglia, with a total of about 250 workers directly employed in production and 120 in plant operation and maintenance. The products supplied much of northern Italy and Switzerland.

=== Other large factories ===
Except for a few sectors, Milanese industry was largely organized on small and medium-sized factories; however, there are some exceptions.

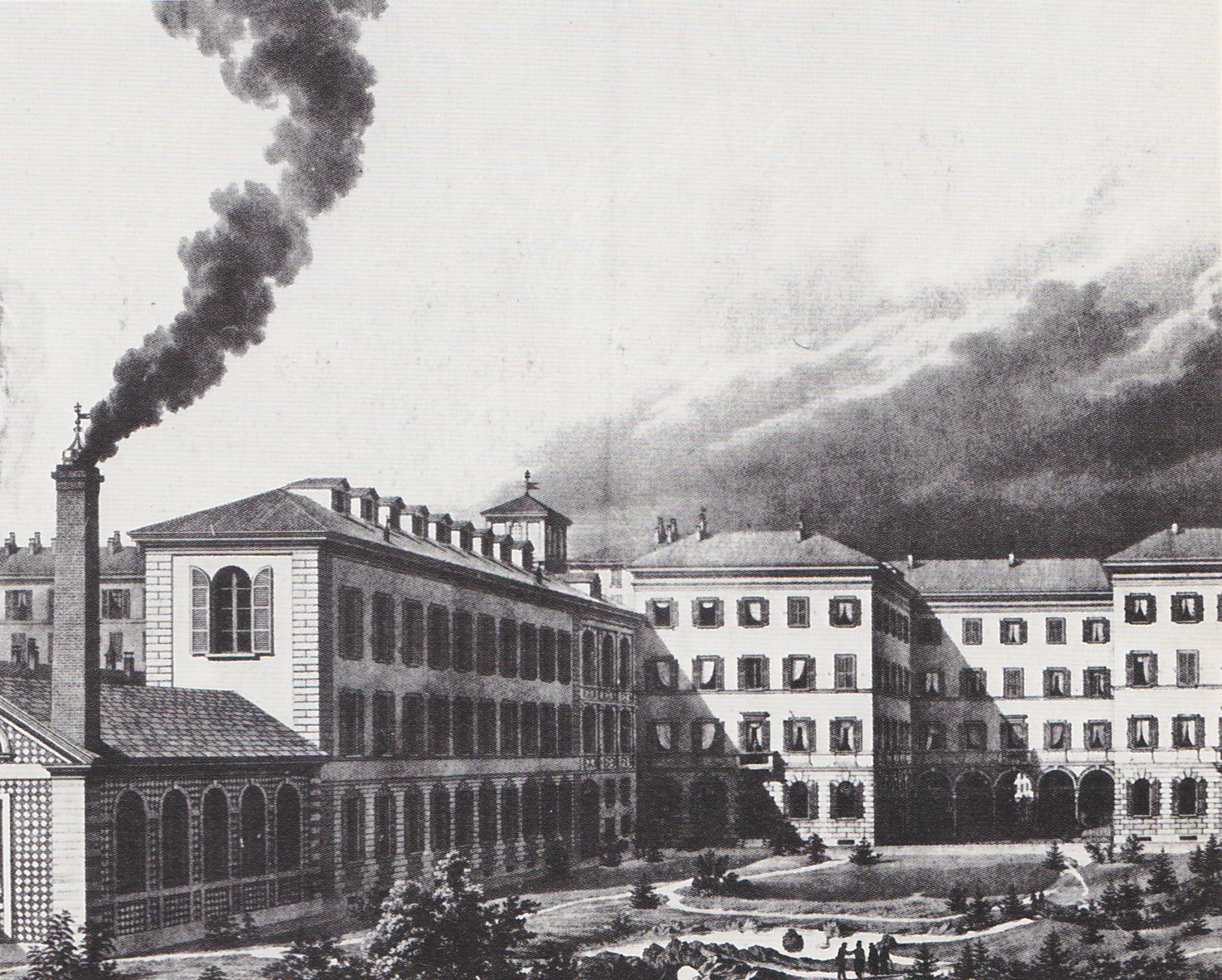
Lithograph of an exterior view of the Binda button factory, c. 1850.

Notable among the largest factories in Lombardy and throughout Italy in the manufacture of sugar was the Calderara Refinery in Milan, which employed about 1,200 workers as of 1850, including the department for the manufacture of fuel for operations. The factory's output amounted to 5,000 tons of sugar per year. As of 1856 this factory, described as "grandiose both for the quantity and the perfection of the machines that it uses and for the quantity of sugar that it processes," was nevertheless the only one in Lombardy: it was able to achieve such results also because of the duties, of 34 cents of a lira per kilo for sugar flours and 73 cents for refined sugars, which protected the factory from foreign, particularly French, producers. Still regarding the sugar refining industry, as of 1829 there were three other refineries in Milan, namely the Azimonti Refinery, the Cernuschi Refinery and the Gnocchi company, described as large factories employing many families: at the time these four refineries provided sustenance for 500 families. Another large factory was the Imperial Regia fabbrica di tabacchi, where as of 1859 1,000 workers were employed, the majority of them women. However, this factory was state-owned and operated under a monopoly. The factory was capable of processing 1200000 kg of tobacco per year.

Another sizable factory also in Milan was the Bottonificio Antonio Binda, founded in 1829, it grew from 145 employees in 1847 to more than 600 in 1858, some of whom were brought in from abroad along with machinery for processing.

Then there were the “Houses of Industry,” built to provide work for the poor and vagrants in order to improve the decorum of the city, both establishments operated in weaving and provided board, lodging and a small stipend to the “assisted.”

- Casa d'industria di San Vincenzo in Prato, located in the suburb of Porta Ticinese, provided work for 500 individuals
- Casa d'industria di San Marco, erected in the suburb of San Marco later than the previous one, was conceived and designed in the same manner and provided work for 600 individuals.

=== Other industries ===
Not belonging to any of the previous industries but equally useful and regarded as a sign of the city's prestige and progress, in 1845 the gas lighting system was inaugurated in the city of Milan, which in 1855 had 40 km of network and a workshop with 3 gasometers at the suburb of Porta Lodovica that provided work for more than 100 workers.

Picking up again on an ancient tradition, instrument factories found their roots in the famous workshops of Cremonese violin makers, above all Antonio Stradivari. In 1856 there were 5 brass instrument factories active in the Lombard provinces, 4 of them in Milan, permanently employing 45 people, while there were only 3 wooden instrument factories all concentrated in the capital, which nevertheless exported products throughout Italy, England, France, the United States and Turkey. Of greater importance was the construction of organs, consisting of 13 factories employing 140 workers for an annual output of about 90 organs, whose products supplied, in addition to all of Lombardy-Veneto, France and Germany. Finally, there were 6 piano factories employing 60 workers, whose products, however, did not enjoy the fame of the instruments imported from Austria, France and England.

Particularly in vogue in the decades before the unification of Italy was the brewing of beer: a total of about 29,000 hectoliters of the beverage were manufactured by the year 1856 by 41 factories. About half of the liters were brewed in the province of Milan, divided, however, among 14 establishments, the most noteworthy establishments included Birrificio Arrigoni, Birrificio Lavelli, and Birrificio Perelli in the province of Milan with a production that stood at just under 2,000 hectoliters of beer each, but above all Birrificio Ritter in Chiavenna, which produced 4,000 hectoliters annually. Also pertaining to the pre-unification period were the Wührer Brewery, founded in Brescia in 1829, whose production was on the order of 500 hectoliters per year, and the Peroni Brewery founded in Vigevano in 1846: both brands are still in operation today. Products for manufacture were generally sourced from Lombardy-Veneto except for hops, imported from Bavaria or Bohemia for higher quality. Employment in this industry, however, did not have a large spillover effect on employment: medium to large factories typically employed around 30 workers. Also pertaining to the spirits industry was the distillation of alcohol: in 1857 the Sessa, Fumagalli and C. distillery was reported, described as “a grand distillery of alcohol, hitherto unique in the whole of Italy”: part of the distillation waste was used to feed about 400 animals housed in three stables adjacent to the distillery. Finally, other distilleries of the time include the Branca Brothers Distillery, still famous and in operation today.

An industry that still exists today is that of furniture making, which has its main district in Brianza. A total of 1,000 workers were reported in this industry, of whom 250 grouped in 30 workshops worked in the city of Milan. Furniture was shipped throughout Lombardy-Veneto and the neighboring provinces of the Austrian Empire. Ignazio Cantù reported in 1844 that the Speluzzi furniture factory with its fifty or so employees was among the largest furniture factories in Milan. Difficult to include in a broader and more articulated category was the goldsmith and costume jewelry sector, which was particularly developed in the city of Milan, where it counted a few years before Unification about 900 workers in the various factories. One of the largest was the Manifattura Treviganti, Galetti e C., which in 1838 had 130 employees.

== See also ==
- Economy of Milan
- Olona mills

== Bibliography ==
- Archeologia industriale in Lombardia. Milano e la bassa [Industrial archaeology in Lombardy. Milan and the lower Po Valley] (in Italian). Milano: Mediocredito lombardo. 1982.
- Storia di Milano. Sotto l'Austria: 1815-1859 [History of Milan. Under Austria: 1815-1859] (in Italian). Vol. 14. Roma: Istituto della Enciclopedia italiana. 1996.
- Storia di Milano. Nell'unità italiana: 1859-1900 [History of Milan. In Italian unification: 1859-1900] (in Italian). Vol. 15. Roma: Istituto della Enciclopedia italiana. 1996.
- Giorgio Bigatti (2000). La città operosa: Milano nell'Ottocento [The industrious city: Milan in the nineteenth century] (in Italian). Milano: FrancoAngeli.
- Valerio Castronovo (1980). L'industria italiana dall'Ottocento a oggi [Italian industry from the nineteenth century to the present.] (in Italian). Milano: Arnoldo Mondadori.
- Etienne Dalmasso (1972). Milano capitale economica d'Italia [Milan, the economic capital of Italy] (in Italian). Milano: FrancoAngeli.
- Franco della Peruta (1987). Milano: lavoro e fabbrica, 1815-1914 [Milan: labor and factory, 1815-1914] (in Italian). Milano: FrancoAngeli.
- Maria Luisa Ferrari (2012). Quies inquieta. Agricoltura e industria in una piazzaforte dell'Impero asburgico [Quies inquieta. Agriculture and industry in a stronghold of the Habsburg Empire.] (in Italian). Milano: FrancoAngeli.
- Giovanni Frattini (1856). Storia e statistica dell'industria manifatturiera lombarda [History and statistics of the manufacturing industry in Lombardy] (in Italian). Milano: tipografia Giuseppe Bernardoni.
- Giovanni Merlini (1857). Il passato, il presente e l'avvenire della industria manifatturiera in Lombardia [The past, present and future of the manufacturing industry in Lombardy] (in Italian). Milano: tipografia Borroni.
- Maurizio Romano (2012). Alle origini dell'industria lombarda: manifatture, tecnologie e cultura economica nell'età della restaurazione [At the origins of Lombard industry: manufactures, technologies and economic culture in the age of restoration] (in Italian). Milano: FrancoAngeli.
- Rosario Romeo (1988). Breve storia della grande industria in Italia 1861-1961 [Brief history of big industry in Italy 1861-1961] (in Italian). Milano: Arnoldo Mondadori.
- B. Tradati (1854). Guida statistica della provincia di Milano 1854 [Statistical guide to the province of Milan 1854] (in Italian). Milano: tipografia Luigi Pirola.
