= Petra Blaisse =

British-born Dutch designer (born 1955)

- Born: 1955 (age 70–71); London, England
- Education: Ealing, Hammersmith and West London College, Academie Minerva
- Partner: Rem Koolhaas

Petra Blaisse (born 1955) is a British-born Dutch designer. Her work is an intersection of the professions of architecture, interior architecture, landscape architecture, textile design, and exhibition design.

== Career ==
She studied at art school in London at Hammersmith College of Art (now known as Ealing, Hammersmith and West London College) and in Groningen at Academie Minerva but she never graduated. Blaisse began her career in the arts by working with photographers and fashion and book illustrators after leaving art school at the age of twenty-one. In 1978 she took a position in the Applied Arts department at the Stedelijk Museum in Amsterdam where she worked until 1987.

=== OMA collaborations ===
Between 1987 and 1991, while working as a freelancer, Blaisse developed an interest in textiles, interior design, and landscape. During that same period, she collaborated with Yves Brunier and Rem Koolhaas on the Museumpark park project in Rotterdam; this project would represent the first of many future collaborations with the Office for Metropolitan Architecture (OMA). Additionally, she worked on the interior for the Nederlands Dans Theater in The Hague and designed exhibitions for OMA at Basel and Rotterdam. She has known her current partner Rem Koolhaas, since 1986 through this work.

=== Inside Outside ===
In 1991, Blaisse founded the Amsterdam-based studio Inside Outside. The office has since completed a number of different project types including the Kunsthal in Rotterdam (1994), the Prada Epicenter in New York (2001), H-Project in Seoul (2004), Casa da Música in Porto (2005), the Mercedes-Benz Museum in Stuttgart (2006), the Prison Gardens in Belgium (2010) and the Dutch Pavilion of the Venice Biennale of Architecture (2012). Blaisse has collaborated with various architects and designers, including Rem Koolhaas, Irma Boom and SANAA.

In 2011, Blaisse returned to the Stedelijk Museum when she was approached by the museum to design a permanent textile installation in order to create a transition between the 118-year-old original museum building and the newly designed extension.

== Field of work ==
Petra Blaisse's encompasses a wide scope of design ranging from architecture, interior design, textile design, exhibition design and landscape architecture. Her studio has worked on a variety of projects such as the set design for a performance of the musical drama, "Narcissus" by Calliope Tsoupaki. Her studio team represents a variety of backgrounds including fashion design, landscape architecture, cultural anthropology, architecture, and theatrical history.

Blaisse's studio name, ‘Inside Outside’, relates to her focus on projects addressing both interior and exterior spaces. Her early career in museums piqued her interest in exhibition design, and through her freelancing years she became more focused in the relationship between exhibition space and the surrounding space, and the exterior. It is characteristic for the spaces in Blaisse's work to merge via a fluid transition that typically employs such materials as textiles, which explains her wide ranged projects between private interior space and urban exterior space. Blaisse considers each project as a part of a more complex entity, and she aims to incorporate every aspect into the design process.

Blaisse often incorporates a broad range of textiles into her projects, designing with curtains, carpets, wall coverings and other flexible objects. These objects create a dialogue between interior and exterior, often creating porous facades. She has for some projects employed transparent textiles, creating an "Invisible Presence"; this is a feature design element of the Glass Pavilion at the Toledo Museum of Art. On one hand, the material creates a sense of security; on the other, it allows light and sound to permeate the boundary between the inside and the outside. Also most of Blaisse's installations are mobile in that way they could be opened and closed if wanted.

Blaisse's landscape work focuses on similar themes. In 1999, she designed the exterior space for a prison. Within the strict regulations, she makes use of path with organic forms and reflections in the windows to create the idea of more space and of endlessness. In 2004, she was awarded first place in a competition for the design of the urban landscape complex Giardini di Porta Nuova, Milan, Italy. In this large-scale public park project, the use of paths is an essential tool for structuring the urban landscape. In 1999, Blaisse designed the exterior space for a prison. Within the strict regulations, she makes use of path with organic forms and reflections in the windows to create the idea of more space and of endlessness.

Blaisses’ projects are custom made solutions on a technical high level that Blaisse developed in collaboration with technical constructors and engineers. As well, her work often refers to the history of the culture, the material and the place. A recent project is the wall covering for the Stedelijk Museum in Amsterdam as a result of intensive historical research. Based on a 17century Gobelin this carpet is manufactured in a highly technologically manner of weaving, developed in collaboration with extern experts. The pattern itself refers to plants, which had grown at the same place 300 years ago. By developing weaving, stitching and sewing, Blaisse also brings new life to historic techniques and materials and makes them very useful as part of contemporary architecture.

== Literature ==
- Blaisse, Petra (6 June 2011). "Shifting Position, Lecture at Harvard University". YouTube. Harvard GSD.
- Blaisse, Petra, Inside Outside, Rotterdam (NAI) 2006.
- Van den Heuvel, Dirk, Inside-outside, in: OASE (1997) 47, pp. 2–19.
- Vanderstraeten, Margot, Ruimte wonder, in: De Morgen (Belgium) April 2014, pp. 48–56.
