= Giuseppe Sala =

Giuseppe Sala may refer to:

- Giuseppe Sala (music publisher) (c.1643-1727), Italian music publisher
- Giuseppe Sala (politician) (born 1958), Italian politician
- Giuseppe Antonio Sala (1762–1839), Italian cardinal of the Roman Catholic church
