= Porta Nuova (Milan) =

Coordinates: 45°28′47.6″N 9°11′33.23″E

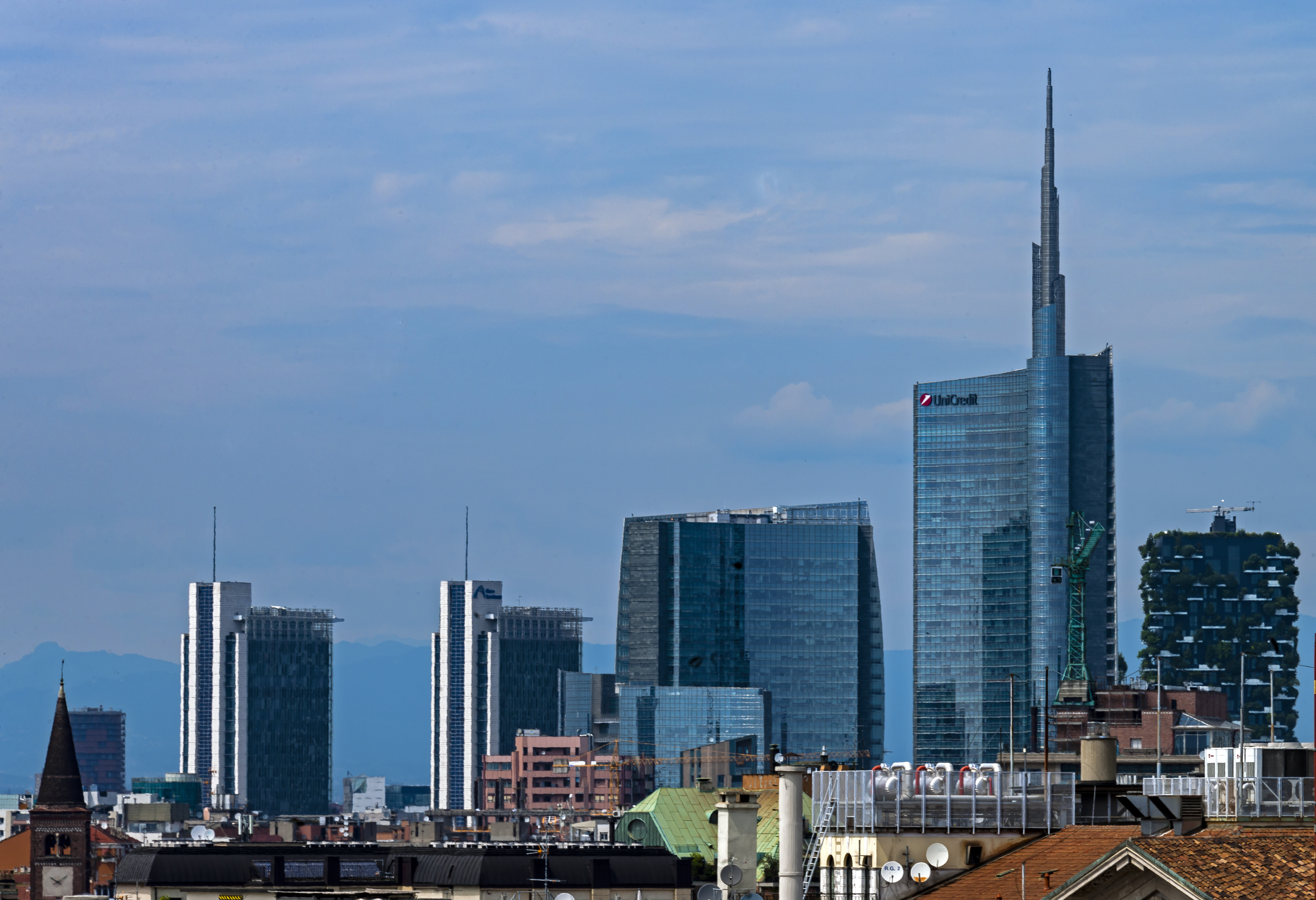
- Interactive map of Porta Nuova
- Sovereign state: Italy
- Region: Lombardy
- Province: Milan

Area
  - Total: 0.35 km^{2} (0.14 sq mi)
- Time zone: UTC+01:00
- Website: www.porta-nuova.com

Porta Nuova (pronounced [ˈpɔrta ˈnwɔːva]; literally "New Gate"; Milanese: Pòrta Noeuva [ˈpɔrta ˈnøːʋa]) is one of the main business districts of Milan, Italy in terms of economy, and part of the Zone 2 administrative division. Named after the well-preserved Neoclassic gate built in 1810 on this site, it is now one of Italy's most high-tech and international districts, containing the country's tallest skyscraper: the UniCredit Tower.

Porta Nuova has a 2017 city GDP of €400 billion, which makes it Europe's richest district within any city. A concentration of companies are based in Porta Nuova, with 4% of all institutions and conglomerates found in Italy, while Milan has 40% of all these business, and Milan's Lombardy Region has 53% of it.

Industrialization is also increasing within the district. Three Fortune 500 companies are located here, namely Alfa Romeo, Pirelli and Techint, with a lot of other significant companies, including luxury fashion house Versace and italian football giants Internazionale. Geographical Porta Nuova was the main engine of the global invention of "polypropylene", or plastic, by Giulio Natta, popularized by several companies within the city during the 1950s. Porta Nuova began manufacturing trams, buses, and trains, as part of Milan's public transport system which now gave Milan Europe's most advanced light rail system.

In 2019, Milan is on course to have several tax-free or flat tax services, as part of attracting domestic and international businesses which will be initiated in the area of Porta Nuova. It is also an integrated response to gain several European Union agencies from United Kingdom following Brexit and to prevent a possible economic fallout.

== History ==
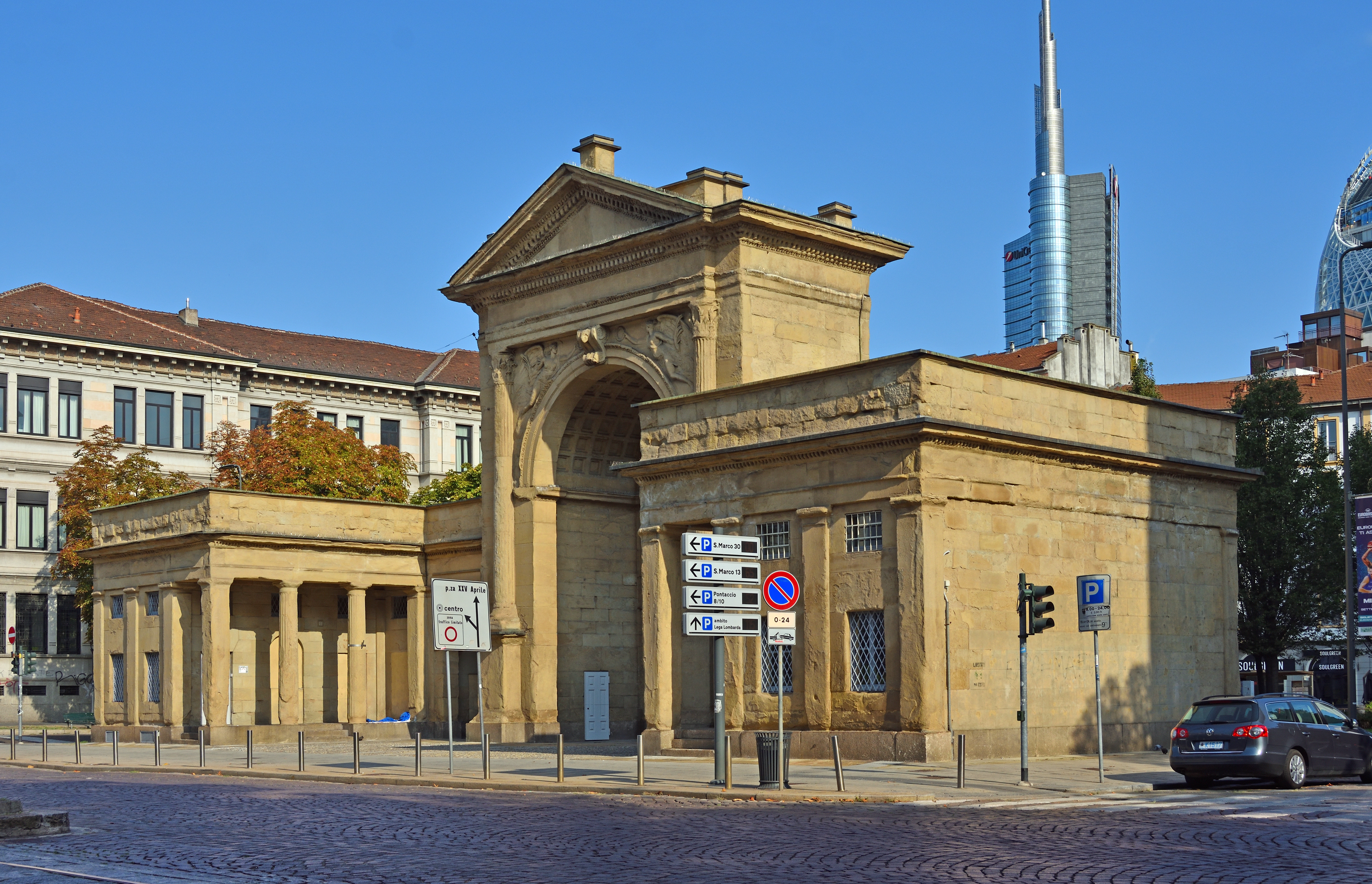
The business district is named after a Neoclassical gate built in 1810.

Porta Nuova is named after the Napoleonic gate which was erected in 1810 from a design by Giuseppe Zanoia.

In the 1990s Milan, a former heavy-industry powerhouse, was filled with about 6 million square metres of industrial wastelands and unused railroad tracks; transforming such places following the example set by London and other post-industrial cities had become a primary objective for the municipal administration.

The Porta Nuova business district project was born in 1997 in collaboration with American real estate developer Gerald D. Hines and his partners, Micheal Topham and Riccardo Catella; the new district took fourteen years to develop and has been built on a large area of central Milan affected by decades of urban decay, after a series of failed development plans in the 1970s.

The 290,000 square metres (later increased to 346,500), US$2.5bn mixed use project was definitively approved in 2005 and was designed by three masterplanners, Pelli Clarke Pelli, Boeri Studio and Kohn Pedersen Fox.

In 2013 Qatar Holding LLC, a unit of the Persian Gulf emirate's sovereign wealth fund, agreed to buy a 40 percent stake in Milan's newly built Porta Nuova business district to expand its Italian real estate holdings. In 2015 Qatar Investment Authority agreed to buy the 60 percent of Porta Nuova it did not already own.

At the end of 2017 construction works began for "Gioia 22", a new 26-story, 120 metres high tower designed by architect Gregg E. Jones of Pelli Clarke Pelli and scheduled to be completed by 2020.

== Area specifications ==
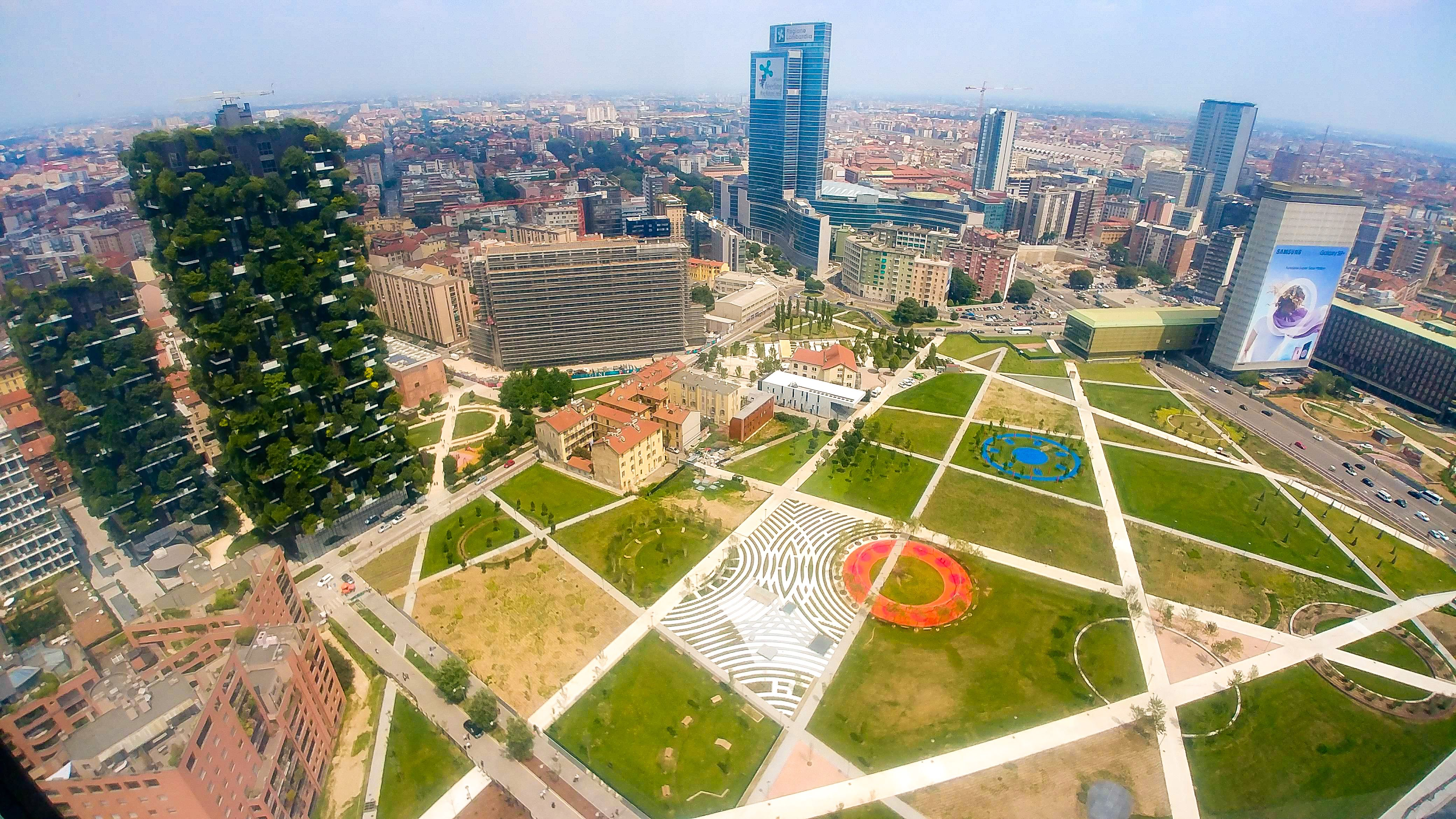
Parco Biblioteca degli Alberi

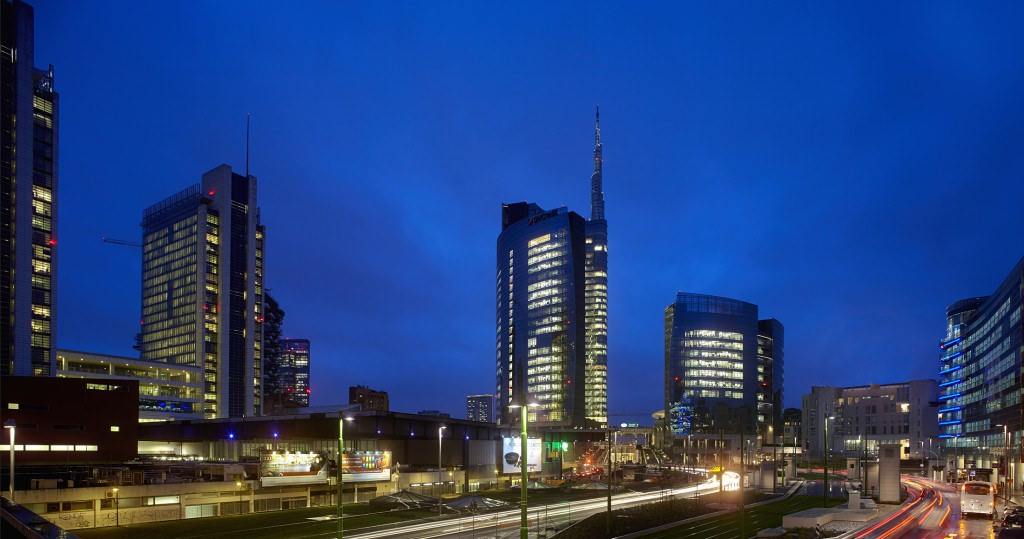
UniCredit Tower in the Garibaldi area.

Pelli Clarke Pelli designed the largest part of the development, the "Garibaldi" area (near Garibaldi railway station), with office and retail compounds extending over 230,500 square metres. It is centered on the UniCredit Tower complex, that features three office towers, of which the largest, a 31-story, 231 metres high asymmetrical tower culminating in a sculptural, 80m stainless steel spire, is currently (as of 2017) the tallest building in Italy.

The "Varesine" area, named after a now demolished railway station that once connected Milan to Varese, has been designed by Kohn Pedersen Fox Associated and occupies 85,000 square metres. The main building of this area is Torre Diamante, a 130 metres high, diamond-shaped tower that is Italy's tallest skyscraper with a steel structure.

The "Isola" area ("island" in Italian, owing its name to the fact that it was once encircled by railway lines), designed by Boeri Studio, extends over 31,500 square metres. Its most distinctive feature is Bosco Verticale, a pair of residential towers covered in trees and vegetation.

Proposed use and area
	Porta Nuova Garibaldi		Porta Nuova Varesine		Porta Nuova Isola	
	m^{2}	ft^{2}	m^{2}	ft^{2}	m^{2}	ft^{2}
Office	50,500	544,000	41,000	440,000	6,300	68,000
Residential	15,000	160,000	33,000	360,000	22,000	240,000
Commercial	10,000	110,000	7,000	75,000	850	9,100
Exhibitions	20,000	220,000	-	-	-	-
Culture	-	-	3,000	32,000	2,360	25,400
Hotel	15,000	160,000	-	-	-	-
Total	230,500	2,481,000	85,000	910,000	31,500	339,000
Car parks	1,200	13,000	2,000	22,000	570	6,100

=== Buildings ===
==== Towers and other buildings ====
Name	Architect	Type	Height (m)	Floors	Year	Headquarters	Notes
UniCredit Tower; Tower A	Cesar Pelli	Offices	231	35	2012	UniCredit	The tower is ranking as eighth in the Emporis 2012, that rewards skyscrapers for excellence in their aesthetic and functional design. It is 151 m tall without the spire.
Palazzo Lombardia	Pei Cobb Freed & Partners	Offices	161	39	2010	Regione Lombardia	The building won the 2012 International Architecture Award for the best new global design. Tallest building in Italy, 2009/2011.
Torre Diamante	Kohn Pedersen Fox	Offices	140	30	2012	BNP Paribas	
Pirelli Tower	Giò Ponti	Offices	127	32	1958	Regione Lombardia	Tallest building in EU, 1958-1966. Tallest building in Italy, 1958-1995. The building was a model for the MetLife Building in New York City and Alpha Tower in Birmingham.
Gioia 22	Cesar Pelli	Mixed Use	122	26+4	2020	Fideuram Bank	
UnipolSai Tower	Mario Cucinella	Offices	120	23	U/C	UnipolSai	
Torre Breda	Luigi Mattioni	Offices	117	30	1954		Tallest building in Italy, 1954/1958. Restoration work completed in 2009.
Botanica	Stefano Boeri	Residential	110		2024		
Torre Galfa	Melchiorre Bega	Hotel; Residences	109	31	1959	Meliá Hotels International	
Gioia 20 East	Citterio, Viel, Partners	Mixed Use	104		2022		
Torre Garibaldi; Tower A	Laura Lazzari	Offices	100	25	1992	Maire Tecnimont	
Torre Garibaldi; Tower B	Laura Lazzari	Offices	100	25	1992	Maire Tecnimont	
UniCredit Tower; Tower B	Cesar Pelli	Offices	100	22	2012	LinkedIn, UniCredit	
P39	Diller Scofidio + Renfro	Mixed-Use	97		2024		
UniCredit Tower; Tower C	Cesar Pelli	Offices	70	12	2012	UniCredit	
Piramide	William McDonough	Offices	70	11	2012	Google, Pandora	
Torre Bonnet	F. Diomede, C. Rusconi Clerici	Offices	68	20	1962	Accenture	
AC Hotel Tower		Hotel	60	20		AC Hotels	
Diamantini	Kohn Pederson Fox	Offices			2012	Bank of America, Canali, Celgene, China Construction Bank, HSBC, Factory Mutual, Salvatore Ferragamo, Samsung, Shire	
Palaxa	Goring & Straja Architects	Offices			2012	AXA	
The Showroom	Piuarch	Offices; Commercial	30	6	2013	Alexander Mc Queen, Limoni, Nike, Tesla	
Green house	Diller Scofidio + Renfro	Mixed-Use	27		2024		

==== Luxury residences ====
Name	Architect	Height (m)	Floors	Year	Notes
Solaria Tower	Arquitectonica	143	37	2013	Tallest residential building in Italy.
Bosco Verticale; Tower E	Stefano Boeri	111	27	2014	The building won the 2014 International Highrise Award. The building is the first model of vertical densification of nature within a city.
Aria Tower	Arquitectonica	100	17	2013	
Solea Tower	Caputo Partnership	79	14	2013	
Bosco Verticale; Tower D	Stefano Boeri	78	18	2014	The building won the 2014 International Highrise Award. The building is the first model of vertical densification of nature within a city.
V33	Vudafieri Saverino Partners		14	2013	
Residenze di Corso Como	Munoz & Albin; Cino Zucchi Architetti			2012	
Corte verde di Corso Como	Cino Zucchi Architetti			2013	
Residenze dei Giardini	Lucien Lagrange			2012	
Ville di Porta Nuova	M2P Associati			2013	

==== Other buildings ====
Name	Architect	Type	Height (m)	Floors	Year	Notes
UniCredit Pavilion / E3 West Building	Michele De Lucchi	Convention centre	22	3	2015	
Coima Pavilion / E3 East Building	Mario Cucinella	Office		3	2016	
Casa della Memoria	Baukuh	Museum		3	2015	Museum dedicated to the Italian resistance movement
Fondazione Riccardo Catella		Culture		2		Hub for the urban development
Incubatore per l'arte		Culture		2		

== See also ==
- Tallest buildings in Italy
- Economy of Milan
