= Bosco Verticale =

Skyscraper complex in Milan, Italy

General information
- Location: Milan, Italy
- Coordinates: 45°29′09″N 09°11′25″E
- Construction started: 2009
- Completed: 2014
- Opened: 17 October 2014

Height
- Roof: Torre E 116 m (381 ft); Torre D 84 m (276 ft)

Technical details
- Floor area: 360,000 m^{2} (3,900,000 sq ft)

Design and construction
- Architects: Boeri Studio: Stefano Boeri, Gianandrea Barreca, Giovanni La Varra
- Developer: Hines Italia & COIMA (Developer); COIMA SGR (Asset Manager); COIMA (Property Manager)
- Awards: International Highrise Award; 2014 Best Tall Building Worldwide; 2015

The Bosco Verticale (Vertical Forest) is a complex of two residential skyscrapers designed by Boeri Studio (Stefano Boeri, Gianandrea Barreca, and Giovanni La Varra) and located in the Porta Nuova district of Milan, Italy. They have a height of 116 metres (381 ft) and 84 m (276 ft) and within the complex is an 11-story office building.

The distinctive feature of the skyscrapers, both inaugurated in 2014, is the presence of over ninety plant species, including tall shrubs and trees, distributed on the facades. It is an ambitious project of metropolitan reforestation that aims to increase the biodiversity of plant and animal species in the Lombard capital through vertical greening, reducing urban sprawl and contributing to the mitigation of the microclimate.

The Bosco Verticale has received recognition in the architectural community, winning numerous awards. In addition to the International Highrise Award in 2014, it was acknowledged by the Council on Tall Buildings and Urban Habitat as the "most beautiful and innovative skyscraper in the world" in 2015 and as one of the "fifty most iconic skyscrapers in the world" in 2019. The prototype of the Milanese project will be replicated in other cities.

== Location ==
The complex is located on Via Federico Confalonieri and Via Gaetano de Castillia, on the outskirts of the Isola district. Since 2005, the area has undergone a series of urban and architectural regeneration interventions as part of the Porta Nuova Project. The Bosco Verticale is situated within the Porta Nuova district, a dense cluster of skyscrapers that includes some of Italy's tallest buildings: the UniCredit Tower, the Palazzo Lombardia, the Pirelli Tower, the Solaria Tower, and several other constructions.

Located 2.5 kilometers from Piazza del Duomo, the two towers are situated in one of the strategic points of Milan's road network, serving as an important intermodal hub for rail and road transportation. In addition to various surface transportation options, the Bosco Verticale is served by the Milan Metro stations of Isola, Gioia, Zara, Centrale FS, Garibaldi FS, and Repubblica.

== History ==
=== Conception ===
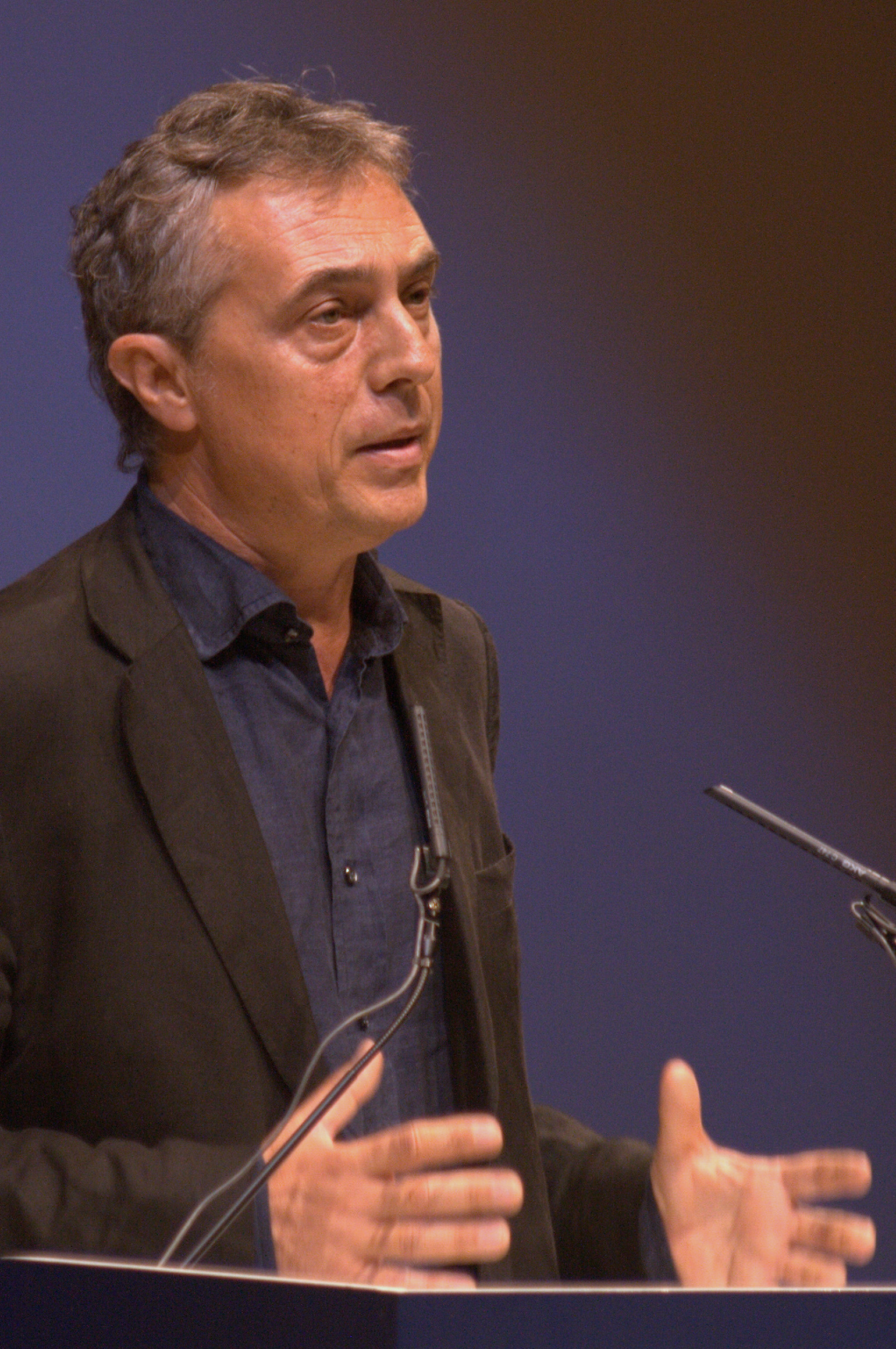
Stefano Boeri, designer of the Bosco Verticale

A house for trees inhabited by humans

— Stefano Boeri

Boeri conceived the idea of constructing a skyscraper covered in trees in April 2007 while he was the director of Domus. During a visit to the metropolis of Dubai in the United Arab Emirates, the architect had the impression of being in a "mineral city, made up of dozens of new towers and skyscrapers, all clad in glass or ceramics or metal, all reflecting sunlight and therefore generating heat in the air and especially on the ground inhabited by pedestrians." His aversion to these steel and glass mineral cities grew when the Spanish architect Alejandro Zaera published research showing that 94% of tall buildings constructed after 2000 were covered in glass. These factors prompted Boeri to design "two towers clad not in glass, but in leaves [...] of plants, shrubs, [...] trees, [...] of life," promising at the same time a reduction in energy consumption through the action of the vegetal screen.
In this regard, the Bosco Verticale is capable of hosting wind generators on the roof and photovoltaic systems along the facades to reduce energy consumption. For further details, see. According to Boeri, the building was inspired by Italo Calvino's 1957 novel The Baron in the Trees, in which the protagonist decides to abandon the ground and live in the trees for the rest of his life. The project was named Bosco Verticale, or in English "Vertical Forest", because together the towers have 800 trees, 5,000 shrubs and 1,500 perennial plants, which help mitigate smog and produce oxygen. These tree-packed high-rises help cities built for density, adding more housing and infrastructure, while improving the air quality. Trees and plants are the most efficient and cost effective way to absorb carbon dioxide. The 20,000 trees and perennial plants in the buildings convert approximately 44,000 pounds (20,000 kg) of carbon each year. With more than 90 species, the buildings' biodiversity is expected to attract new bird and insect species to the city. It is also used to moderate temperatures in the buildings in the winter and summer, by shading the interiors from the sun and blocking harsh winds. The vegetation also protects the interior spaces from noise pollution and dust from street-level traffic. Boeri's proposal was first formalized with the publication of an article in an Italian newspaper titled "Milan Will Be the Birthplace of the First Biological and Sustainable Tower," and then with the drafting of a "Manifesto of the Bosco Verticale" to promote vibrant and sustainable architecture. These premises were considered sufficient by Hines, a multinational real estate company that was leading a large-scale urban and architectural redevelopment project in the Porta Nuova district of Milan, known as the Porta Nuova Project.
Originally, the area where the Bosco Verticale now stands was occupied by the railway tracks of the old Milano Porta Nuova station; with the inauguration of the current Milano Centrale station in 1931, the old station was closed and then moved back in 1961, forming the current Milano Porta Garibaldi station. The resulting empty space, known as "Varesine," became a real wound in the urban fabric, with the area gradually becoming more isolated due to "fragmentation of ownership and a lack of unified will for the revival of this area of Milan." For more information, see:

=== Construction ===
The Bosco Verticale under construction in 2011

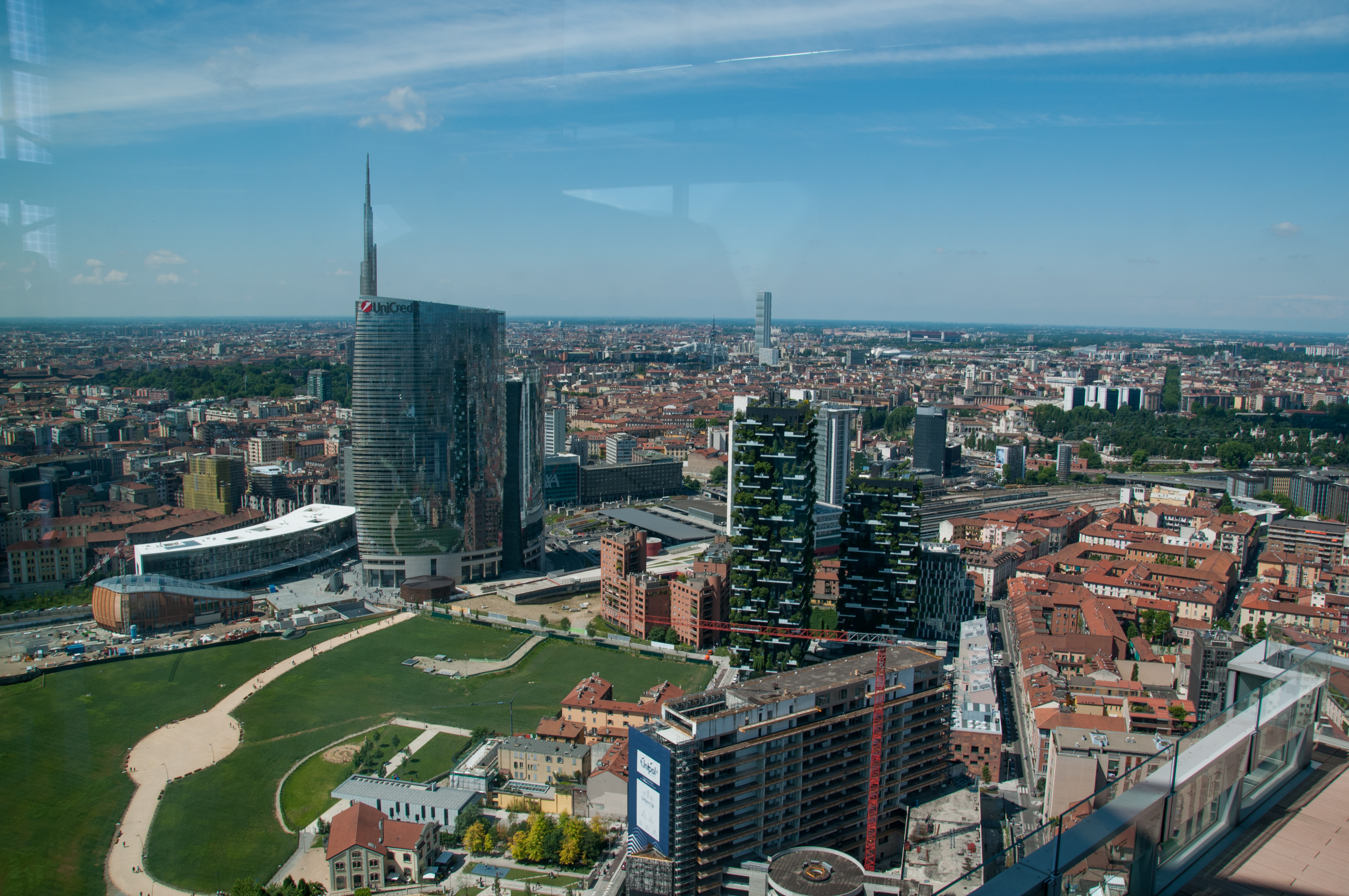
Towers with trees planted (center)

Construction of the Bosco Verticale began in the autumn of 2009, employing around six thousand onsite construction workers. Between mid-2010 and early 2011, construction progressed very slowly and the towers rose by only five floors while the core rose to the seventh floor. Construction progressed throughout 2011, and by the beginning of 2012 the structures were completed, and construction of the façades and installation of the plants began on 13 June 2012. On 11 April 2012, one of the buildings was used as a temporary art gallery and opened to the public for an art exhibition hosted during Milan Fashion Week. On April 22, 2013, the South Tyrolean company ZH, which had been entrusted with the construction of the two towers, declared bankruptcy due to the ongoing economic crisis. After assessing the "state of the works, the development of construction projects, the issuance of orders for the supply of materials, and logistical arrangements," the company was promptly replaced by Colombo Costruzioni, which restarted construction in May of the same year.

Towers prior to tree planting (right edge of photo)

The design was tested in a wind tunnel to ensure the trees would not topple from gusts of wind. Botanists and horticulturalists were consulted by the engineering team to ensure that the structure could bear the load imposed by the plants. The steel-reinforced concrete balconies are designed to be 28 cm (11 in) thick, protruding 3.35 m (11.0 ft), and asymmetrically placed between each other. With its green design, Bosco Verticale is the first of Boeri's "Vertical Forests". He regarded the building as a prototype for his subsequent projects. As part of his campaign on urban forestry, Boeri also allowed other architects to incorporate his vision into their works. Boeri later designed similar structures in Switzerland, the Netherlands (Trudo Vertical Forest in Eindhoven, completed in 2021), and multiple cities in China (one of them is the Easyhome Huanggang Vertical Forest City Complex in Huanggang, opened in 2022).

The Bosco Verticale, completed in the autumn of 2014, was finally inaugurated and presented to the public on October 10 of the same year. Despite sporadic criticisms, it received extensive attention, as evidenced by the numerous awards it received and the significant amount of scientific research, study actions, and documentaries dedicated to it.

== Awards ==
On 19 November 2014, the Bosco Verticale was awarded the International Highrise Award, a prestigious international competition held every two years to honour excellence in recently constructed buildings that stand a minimum of 100 m (330 ft) tall. The building was chosen as the winner from among eight hundred skyscrapers from all continents, as it was considered an "excellent example of revitalizing an urban center." The five finalists were selected from 26 nominees in 17 countries. In his speech, Peter Cachola Schmal, director of the German Architecture Museum and a member of the jury, emphasized:

I am very impressed by the style of this work, by what it represents, and by the results that architecture can achieve. The Bosco Verticale undoubtedly provides protection and space, while simultaneously combining elements such as nature, light, and air, taking into account human needs in a balanced relationship between elements that are never more complex than necessary. It is a courageous and radical idea for the cities of tomorrow.

On 12 November 2015, the Council on Tall Buildings and Urban Habitat (CTBUH) Awards Jury selected the Bosco Verticale as the overall "2015 Best Tall Building Worldwide" and recognized it as the "most beautiful and innovative skyscraper in the world" at the 14th Annual CTBUH International Best Tall Building Awards Symposium, Ceremony & Dinner, celebrated at the Illinois Institute of Technology in Chicago. The complex was chosen as the winner of the competition due to its experimental uniqueness:

The Bosco Verticale is a unique example of the use of greenery in height and proportion. The "living facade" of the building, incorporating numerous trees and over 90 species of plants, serves as an active interface with the surrounding environment. What makes the idea exceptional is the action of the plants, which act as an extension of the building's external covering. The jury described the exploration of the vitality of greenery at such heights as innovative.

Furthermore, in 2019, the same organization included the Bosco Verticale in its publication of the list of the fifty most iconic skyscrapers in the world built in the last fifty years. It was considered valuable as a crystallization of the "idea that living nature can become an essential component of design and forests an indispensable principle of urban planning," in the words of the designer.

The Bosco Verticale was selected as an example of "virtuous and exportable urban development" by the 21st Conference of the Parties to the UNFCCC. This led to the replication of this experiment in the municipality of Shijiazhuang in the Hebei province of China, where a green and sustainable city was built in harmony with the environment.

== Influences ==
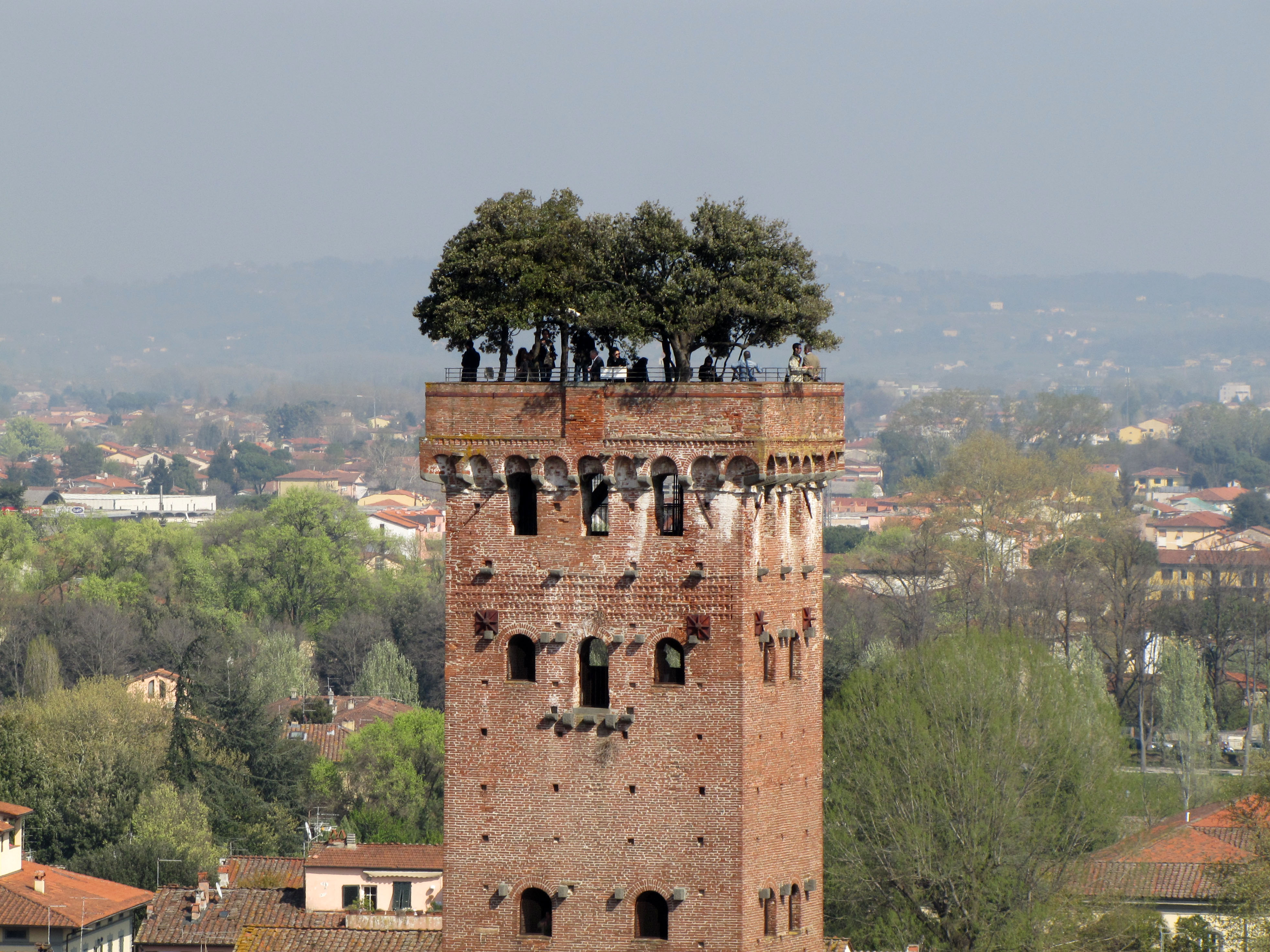
The Torre Guinigi in Lucca, with its trees on top, is a precursor to the Bosco Verticale.

The idea of incorporating greenery into architecture was not introduced by the Bosco Verticale. The pioneers of this trend include the Hanging Gardens of Babylon, built around 590 BC by King Nebuchadnezzar II, as well as the marsh meadows developed in the 13th century by Cistercian monks, (Note: The technique of so-called "marsh meadows" involves constantly submerging crops with a thin layer of water, thus promoting the agricultural recovery of marshes and ponds. These irrigated meadows are characteristic of the lowlands of Lombardy, where the optimization of land productivity through proper water drainage was already widespread. For more information, see: Alessandro Vivenza. "Marcita" (in Italian). Treccani.) and the Torre Guinigi in Lucca, a Bosco Verticale avant la lettre, with a rooftop hanging garden featuring seven centuries-old holm oak trees.

However, many of the reference projects for the Bosco Verticale can be attributed to the field of "green architecture," which developed in the second half of the 20th century. Among the most vibrant sources of inspiration are the Casa nel Bosco (House in the Woods) by Cini Boeri, Stefano's mother, which was built in a birch forest and designed in a zigzag pattern to avoid the felling of trees. Among the precursors to the Bosco Verticale are also the utopian residences of Friedensreich Hundertwasser, with facades completely covered by the foliage of "tenant trees" (as the architect himself stated), and the rooftop gardens of Emilio Ambasz, who operated according to an approach of "green on gray."

Conceptually, Boeri was also greatly influenced by literary or musical works that explore the interaction between humans and nature. Among them were Il barone rampante (The Baron in the Trees), where the protagonist (Cosimo Piovasco di Rondò) decides to build his daily life in the trees, and a song by Adriano Celentano titled Un albero di trenta piani (A Thirty-Floor Tree), which goes:

Ah, I can't breathe anymore / I feel like I'm suffocating a bit / I feel the breath going down / going down and not coming up / I only see that / something is growing... / maybe it's a tree / yes, it's a thirty-floor tree

== Vegetation ==
Close-up of vegetation on Bosco Verticale

In total, the facades of the Bosco Verticale accommodate 730 trees (480 large, 250 small), 5,000 shrubs, and 11,000 perennials and groundcover on its façades. The original design had specified 1,280 tall plants and 920 short plants encompassing 50 species. Overall, the vegetation is the equivalent of that found in a one hectare of forest. The innovative use of heat pump technology helps reduce heating and cooling costs.

There are a total of 94 different plant species, of which 59 are beneficial for birds, 60 are trees and shrubs, and 33 are evergreens.

=== Benefits ===
The vegetation provides numerous beneficial effects to the two towers and the surrounding urban environment, both from an environmental and a climatic perspective. The Bosco Verticale contributes to the creation of a microclimate that generates humidity, filters fine particles (or diverts their path), significantly reduces noise pollution, purifies the air by removing carbon dioxide from the atmosphere and emitting oxygen, provides protection from solar radiation through leaf shading, and acts as a windbreak through the windbreaking action of the foliage.

From a faunal perspective, the Bosco Verticale protects biodiversity by creating biological habitats. The numerous plant species distributed along the facades constitute a true ecosystem capable of attracting birds and insects (1,600 were counted in 2014), "becoming an urban sensor for the spontaneous vegetal and animal recolonization of the city."

The Bosco Verticale [...] contributes [...] to the production of oxygen, the absorption of fine particles from traffic pollution, and the reduction of temperature fluctuations between the interior and the exterior.

— Stefano Boeri

=== Arrangement of species and colors ===
Another characteristic of the Vertical Forest is the ever-changing colors of the trees that cover its surfaces. The tree species not only renew their own colors with the changing seasons, but also the colors of the entire architectural structure. During the spring, the two towers assume delicate pastel shades, while in autumn, at the end of the growing season, warm hues become more prominent.

The distribution of tree species is not arbitrary. The plants have been strategically placed based on various formal and aesthetic criteria, including their ornamental qualities, flowering seasons, potential allergenicity, canopy and trunk development, and ease of maintenance. As a result, evergreen species are located on the southwest side, while deciduous species are found on the northeast side.

Laura Gatti, an agronomist and landscape architect who, together with Emanuela Borio, curated the vegetal screen of the complex, provides a summary of the different appearances of the two towers throughout the year:

What will the two towers look like in different seasons? Naturally, it will vary greatly depending on the facade's exposure. Generally, on the south side of the Vertical Forest towers, we have placed colorful and vibrant evergreen species. On the north and west sides, there will be deciduous plants with autumnal tones, while the east side will feature soft, fresh, spring-like shades. The spectacle and visual experience will be different in each season.

The following table presents the colors assumed by some of the plant species during the four seasons:

Plant Name	Image	Autumn	Winter	Spring	Summer	Plant Name	Image	Autumn	Winter	Spring	Summer
Holly oak Quercus ilex		●	●	●	●	Downy Oak Quercus pubescens		●		●	●
Golden-rain Tree Koelreuteria paniculata		●		●	●	Corbezzolo (strawberry tree) Arbutus unedo		●	●	○	●
Wild Pear Pyrus pyraster		●		○	●	Manna Ash Fraxinus ornus		●		○	●
Pero corvino (serviceberry / shadbush) Amelanchier lamarckii		●	●	○	●	Ginestra dei carbonai (broom) Cytisus scoparius		●	●	●	●
Biancospino (hawthorn) Crataegus monogyna		●		○	●	Ceanoto (soap bush) Ceanothus spp		●	●	●	●
Iperico calicino Hypericum calycinum		●		●	●	Plumbago blu (leadwort) Ceratostigma plumbaginoides		●		●	●

=== Basins ===
Each of the containers is designed not to excessively affect the root growth of the plant, preventing root-related issues. The size of the container generally varies depending on the plant's water and root requirements. For trees, the length is usually 1.10 meters, and the width is the same, while for shrubs and bushes, containers with a minimum length and depth of 0.5 meters have been adopted. All the basins are made of concrete and equipped with a bituminous waterproof layer and a protective lining, effectively limiting root penetration. Along the inner surfaces of the basins, a separation and drainage layer is applied to separate the substrate from the waterproof membrane placed at the bottom of the container. The drainage layer consists of non-woven synthetic geotextile and an anti-root polyethylene sheath.

To anchor the plants, welded steel frame are used, effectively securing the root ball. In the case of large trees, aerial steel anchoring systems have been adopted. Moreover, the anchoring systems involve not only the basins but also individual plants, which are protected by temporary, base, and redundant fastening devices to prevent overturning or falling, especially under extreme and unexpected environmental conditions.

The cultivation substrate for the entire flora of the Bosco Verticale consists of a mixture of organic and inorganic substances. Notably, the use of lapillus, a porous volcanic scoria, is employed due to its high water retention capacity, excellent cation exchange properties, and long-lasting durability.

=== Identification codes ===
Each tree species in the Bosco Verticale is uniquely identified by a sequence of numbers and alphabetical characters based on the plant's scientific name and location (floor and terrace). As an example:

QI.02.V01

The first two characters are the initials of the plant's scientific name (in this case, the holm oak, Quercus ilex). The following two sets of characters identify the floor number (second digit) and the terrace code (V01) where the plant is located.

=== Irrigation ===
The irrigation of the trees is carried out using a centralized maintenance drip irrigation system. The water used is reclaimed from graywater produced by the building, or from the groundwater. Once accumulated in a cistern, the groundwater flows through a visible irrigation pipeline network that automatically blocks the water flow at temperatures below 0 degrees Celsius due to its resistance to low temperatures. This control is performed by a series of remotely monitored sensors that can detect any malfunctions.

Water supply to individual plants is ensured by a control system composed of a drain valve, pressure regulator, and a filtering unit. The electrically operated irrigation system also takes into account the actual water requirements of the vegetation. Each valve operates independently of the others to ensure optimal water flow. An automatic air vent valve and a drip wing allow watering of the cultivation substrate.

== Structure ==
The Bosco Verticale consists of two towers, the De Castillia Tower (formerly Tower E) and the Confalonieri Tower (formerly Tower D), with heights of 110 and 76 meters (26 and 18 floors), respectively. They are connected by an L-shaped base. Both structures feature balconies made of reinforced concrete that protrude irregularly on all four sides of the buildings, with a projection of 3.25 meters. The staggered arrangement of the balconies not only adds dynamism to the profile of the Bosco Verticale but also allows the growth of trees up to nine meters tall. The inclusion of trees of such dimensions was not initially planned in the earlier versions of the project, which envisaged continuous strip balconies.

In metaphorical and conceptual terms, the Bosco Verticale can be compared to a large tree, where the balconies are the branches, the collection of plant species are the leaves, the central body of the building is the trunk, and the water supply systems are the roots.

— Stefano Boeri

The Bosco Verticale is clad in large-format panels made of gunmetal gray porcelain stoneware with a matte finish. It is noteworthy that brick is used, concealed beneath the surface. The choice of brick for the cladding and structural walls is due to its well-established flexibility of use.

=== Vibration control ===
Although built on a terrain with ideal lithological conditions and limited influence of the underlying groundwater, the Bosco Verticale is equipped with an energy dissipation system that effectively dampens vibrations. The adoption of this technology is necessary to prevent the propagation of potential seismic waves and, especially, vibrations induced by the transit of trains on the M2 and M5 metro lines, located to the north and east of the site, respectively.

The presence of the two metro tunnels, with the extrados only 3.5 meters away from the foundations of the two towers, poses a significant source of interference due to anomalies in the guidance of rolling stock and irregularities in the rail structure. The structural stability and acoustic comfort of the residents in the two towers are ensured by the installation of damping materials capable of "floating" the structure. The sound insulation values achieved with helical steel springs correspond to 3.5 hertz.

=== Cladding ===
The Bosco Verticale features layered cladding, with pre-coupled thermal insulation made of extruded polystyrene (10.0 cm), blocks of lightweight paste brick (25.0 cm) with a plaster finish (1.5 cm), air gaps, and an advanced screen facade made of porcelain stoneware slabs (55×120×1.4 cm). The substructure is composed of aluminum uprights. Similarly, the walls separating the stairwell from the residential units consist of cassette masonry, with lightweight paste brick (8.0 cm), plasterboard cladding (1.5 cm), a mortar layer (1.0 cm), mineral insulation panels (80% recycled glass, 6.0 cm), and a poritized brick wall (12.0 cm) with plaster finish (EI 120, 3.0 cm).

The brick walls are connected to the substructure using T-shaped brackets, while the slabs are mechanically fixed and overlaid with milled ceramics and grooves with aluminum profiles, where the four support hooks are attached. A strip of structural adhesive between the back of the slab and the side wings of the profile is applied to ensure proper load distribution in windy conditions. Additionally, to maintain material continuity, comb joints are inserted every 3–4 slabs.

To increase robustness and resistance and provide an adequate support system, the load-bearing walls are constructed using regular brick blocks (25.0×19×48 cm) rectified to a specific weight of 800 kg/m^{3}. This ensures that the extreme value of the load-bearing capacity (breaking load) is approximately 7 kN, as experimentally measured. Stainless steel (18% chromium, 8% nickel) clamps, equipped with anti-drip washers and hanging outward, are also applied to maintain thermal insulation properties without compromising the structural integrity.

== See also ==
- Biophilic design

== Bibliography ==
- Adolfo F. L. Baratta (June 2015). Il laterizio celato. Soluzioni tecnologiche nel Bosco Verticale. Rome: Università degli Studi Roma Tre.
- Marco Biraghi, Gabriella Lo Ricco, Silvia Micheli (2013). Guida all'architettura di Milano, 1954–2015. Milan: Ulrico Hoepli. ISBN 978-88-203-5888-4.
- Stefano Boeri (2015). Guido Musante, Azzurra Muzzonigro (ed.). Un bosco verticale; Libretto di istruzioni per il prototipo di una città foresta (in Italian and English). Corraini Edizioni. ISBN 978-88-7570-541-1.
- Luca Buzzoni. Engineering a forest in the sky (PDF). ARUP. Archived from the original (PDF) on 23 July 2015.
- Rossella C. Gambetti; Luca Pellegrini (2010). La comunicazione nella filiera immobiliare. Fondamenti concettuali, principi gestionali e strumenti operativi. Milan: FrancoAngeli. ISBN 978-88-568-2532-9.
- Luisella Gelsomino; Ottorino Marinoni (2009). Territori europei dell'abitare: 1999-2010. Bologna: Editrice Compositori. ISBN 978-88-7794-648-5. *Elena Giacomello (2015). A New Urban Forest Rises in Milan (PDF). CTBUH.
- Elena Giacomello; Giacomo Valagussa (2015). Vertical Greenery: evaluating the High-Rise Vegetation of the Bosco Verticale, Milan (PDF). CTBUH. ISBN 978-0-939493-42-5.
- Friedensreich Hundertwasser (27 February 1972). Manifesto: Il tuo diritto della finestra, il tuo dovere dell'albero. Düsseldorf.
- Antony Wood; Payam Bahrami; Daniel Safarik (29 August 2014). Green Walls in High-Rise Buildings (PDF). Chicago: Images Publishing. ISBN 978-1-86470-593-5.
