= Economy of Milan =

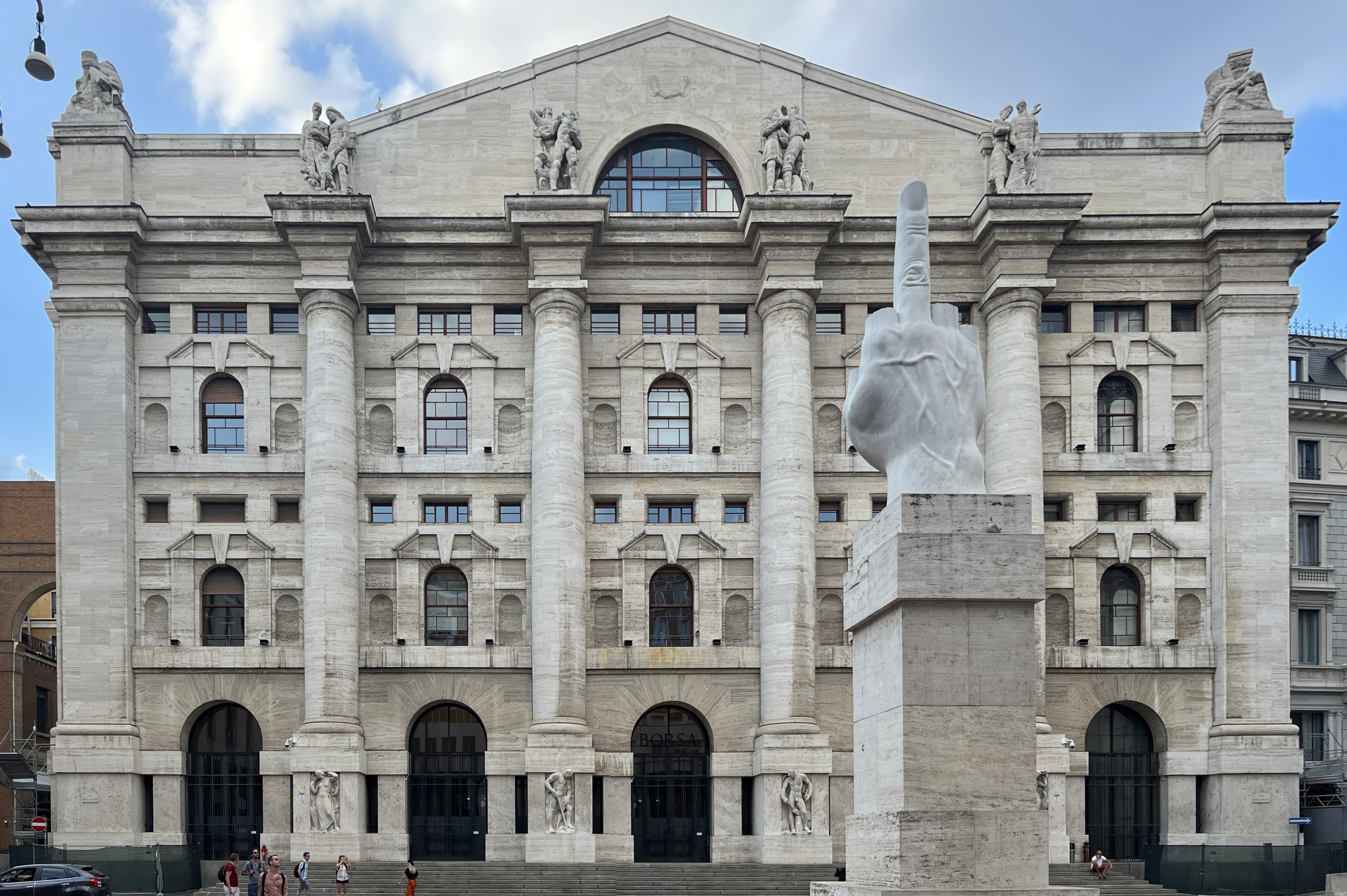
Borsa Italiana, the Stock Exchange in Milan

Milan is the capital of the Lombardy region in northern Italy and is the wealthiest city in Italy and its economic capital. Milan and Lombardy had a GDP of €400 billion ($493 billion) and €650 billion ($801 billion) respectively in 2017. Milan surpassed Berlin in the size of its economy in 2014, and has since been the richest city among the Four Motors for Europe. It is located in the Blue Banana corridor among Europe's economic leaders. Milan's hinterland is Italy's largest industrial area. Milan's GDP per capita of about €49,500 (US$55,600) ranks among Italy's highest.

Milan's Porta Nuova District is Europe's richest subdivision within any city, with a GDP of €257 billion ($308 billion) in 2016 which is comparable to the GDP of the world's 34th richest country, Philippines. The city center also houses Europe's most expensive street, Via Montenapoleone and the National Stock Exchange, Borsa Italiana.

Milan is considered as one of the fashion capitals of the World together with New York, Paris, and London. Major fashion houses and labels, such as Versace, Armani, Valentino, Prada, Dolce & Gabbana, Moschino, Moncler, Luxottica, Trussardi, and Missoni are headquartered in Milan.

Milan was named Europe's most expensive city in 2015 based on the cost of its lodgings ranking higher than Stockholm in second place and Munich in third place. Milan is the world's 11th most expensive city for expatriate employees and its influence in fashion, commerce, business, banking, design, trade and industry makes it a global city.

== Economic history ==
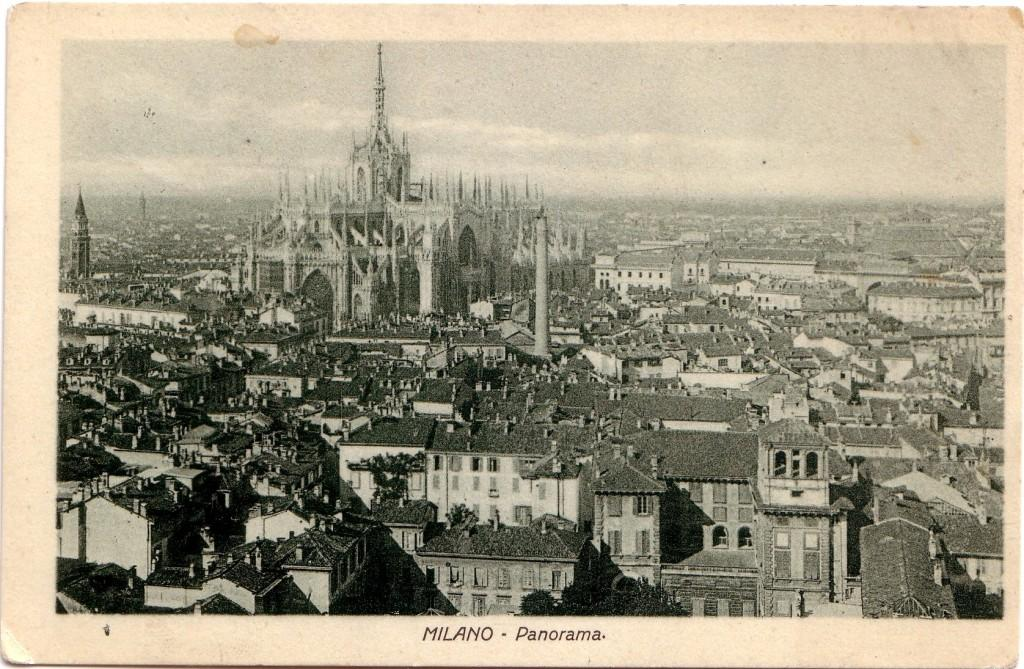
A view of Milan in 1910. The chimney of the Santa Radegonda plant near Duomo is clearly visible. The plant, built in 1883, was the first power plant in Europe

Since the late 12th century, Milan has been a wealthy and industrious city with the production of armours and wool. During the Renaissance, Milan was a center of production of luxury goods, textiles, hats and fabrics, along with Venice, Rome and Florence. The English word millinery, referring to women's hats in the 19th century, came from the word Milan.

Towards the late 19th and early 20th centuries, Milan became a major European industrial centre for the automotive industry, chemicals, textiles, tools, heavy machinery and book and music publishing, with thousands of companies already headquartered in the city.

After the city's World War II bombings and the opening of the Milan camp for refugees, the city (and country) witnessed an "economic miracle", with new buildings being built (such as the Pirelli Tower), more industries opening up and hundreds of thousand of immigrants from Southern Italy migrating to the city.

The first oil crisis in 1973 marked the end of the post‑war boom and initiated a period of deindustrialisation in Milan. Between 1971 and 1991 the number of industrial workers in the city fell from 392 325 to 186 131. Nevertheless, because Milan also serves as a centre for finance, media and commerce, the city managed the shift from an industry‑dominated economy to a service‑based one relatively successfully. This contrasts with the two other cities of the so‑called “industrial triangle” (triangolo industriale) in north‑western Italy—Turin and Genoa—whose economies, historically rooted in the automotive and shipping sectors, struggled to achieve a comparable transition to services.

Beginning in the 1980s the city experienced a strong flow of immigrants, and became a major international and cosmopolitan centre for expatriate employees. A study showed that by the late-1990s, more than 10% of the city's workers were foreigners. According to the Italian National Institute of Statistics (ISTAT), 181,393 foreign-born immigrants lived in the city in January 2008, representing 13.9% of the total population.

Brownfield sites made up roughly 13 % of Milan's municipal area. A decisive turning point came in 1985, when the city concluded a non‑binding agreement with the Pirelli Group to redevelop its former industrial complex in the district of Bicocca into a technology park. The initiative later paved the way for the establishment of the University of Milano‑Bicocca, which was formally created in 1998 after separating from the traditional Università degli Studi di Milano. This development symbolically marked Milan's transition to a knowledge‑based economy. Further brownfield redevelopments followed, notably the Porta Nuova (completed in 2016) and Tre Torre/City Life (completed in 2020) projects, which transformed additional former industrial zones into mixed‑use, high‑tech districts.

== Production and sectors ==
Milan had a strong industrial and economic production after the war, however, it fell slightly in the late 1990s and early 2000s, especially with the tangentopoli political scandal. However, from 2004 onwards, economic growth started to increase again, with an average of 1%, below Lombardy (whose growth rate was 4.6%) and the Italy's 2004 6% average, and a significant reduced production in some industries: footwear (-11.4%), textiles (-6.1%) and clothing (-5%). The bulk of the plastic (-2%), chemicals (-1.8%) and mechanics (-1.6%) industries show a downward trend. Publishing production decreased by -2.6%, while the wood-processing industry production decreased by -1.2%. In contrast, despite an industrial decrease in production, Milan has had a rapid and strong growth in the tertiary and quaternary sectors, with logistics and transport (+6.8%) and food (+1.7%). Milan also has an important role in book production and publishing. It is the most important city in the nation for publishing.

== Banks and other services ==
Banks throughout Italy went through many changes in the late 1800s to early 1900s. One of the Milanese banks, the SBI, had many issues resolving its resources. It did not have support from foreign banks nor enough savings domestically. Other banks during this time in Italy, specifically during the 1907 international crisis, had high liquid assets and would have had to go bankrupt without the help from Banca d'Italia. A group of industrialists and bankers from Milan transformed the banking institute Figli di Weil Schott e C. into the Società Bancaria Milanese.

Most traditional industries have relocated to other locations other than cities or have even closed down since the late 1970s in Italy. However, Milan, became Italy's most successful postindustrial city. Milan's service sector has benefited from the efficiency of the city's banks and the stock market, the Borsa Italiana located in Piazza degli Affari in the centre of the city. The majority of the services revolve around the Fashion industry, but the city is also a world centre of design at whole. There are specialties in the city in furniture design, graphic design, among other specialties. The design industry is centrally located to the Besana in the Brianza area north of the city. Communications is also a major service sector of the city. Milan is home to Mondadori, one of Italy's largest publishing group. In addition, the newspapers Corriere della Sera and La Gazzetta dello Sport.

Porta Nuova is the main business district of Milan, and one of the most important in Italy. AXA, Bank of America, BNP Paribas, China Construction Bank, FinecoBank, Finanza & Futuro Banca, FM Global, HSBC, KPMG, Mitsubishi UFJ Financial Group, UniCredit, UnipolSai and many other companies have their headquarters in Porta Nuova.

Milan's service sector has benefited from the efficiency of the city's banks and the stock market, the Borsa Italiana, located in Piazza degli Affari in the centre of the city.

== Exports, imports, and trade ==
Milan's main trading partners are Switzerland, Russia, Turkey and the European Union (especially other Italian cities). In non-European trade, the main trading, exporting and importing partners are China, Hong Kong, the countries of North Africa, Singapore and United Arab Emirates. The city's main export products are electronics, electrical engineering, steel, textile and clothing products and motor vehicles (which, however, has dropped drastically in 2005 by 28.6%). On the import side of things, the main partners in Milan South Korea, Thailand, India, China, Hong Kong, Taiwan, and Japan. The imported goods from around 86% of these countries. Also, the city imports a significant amount from South American countries and the European Union (Germany, Belgium, Netherlands are the main partners)

== Employment ==
Employment in Italy is linked to manufacturing as it has been seen that when there are technological changes in place, there is typically a positive effect on job growth; therefore, on employment rates. This was seen in the late twentieth century in the country as a whole.

There is a steady workforce in the city of Milan due to the presence of new graduates from the five major universities located in the city. In the province, there are 1.6 million individuals employed, and about twenty five percent of that population are recorded as self-employed. The unemployment rate in Milan is recorded to be less than half of the national average, at about 4.6% in 2001.

In 2011, the unemployment rate of the city of Milan was recorded to be 5.8%, which is much lower than the entire nation of Italy's unemployment rate being at 8.4% in that year. As of January 2014, the unemployment rate in all of Europe is much higher, and the unemployment rate in Italy rose to 12.9% from 12.7% from December, which was the highest growth since 1977 in the nation, the entire nation was affected by this job loss and growth in rate of unemployment.

== Fashion ==
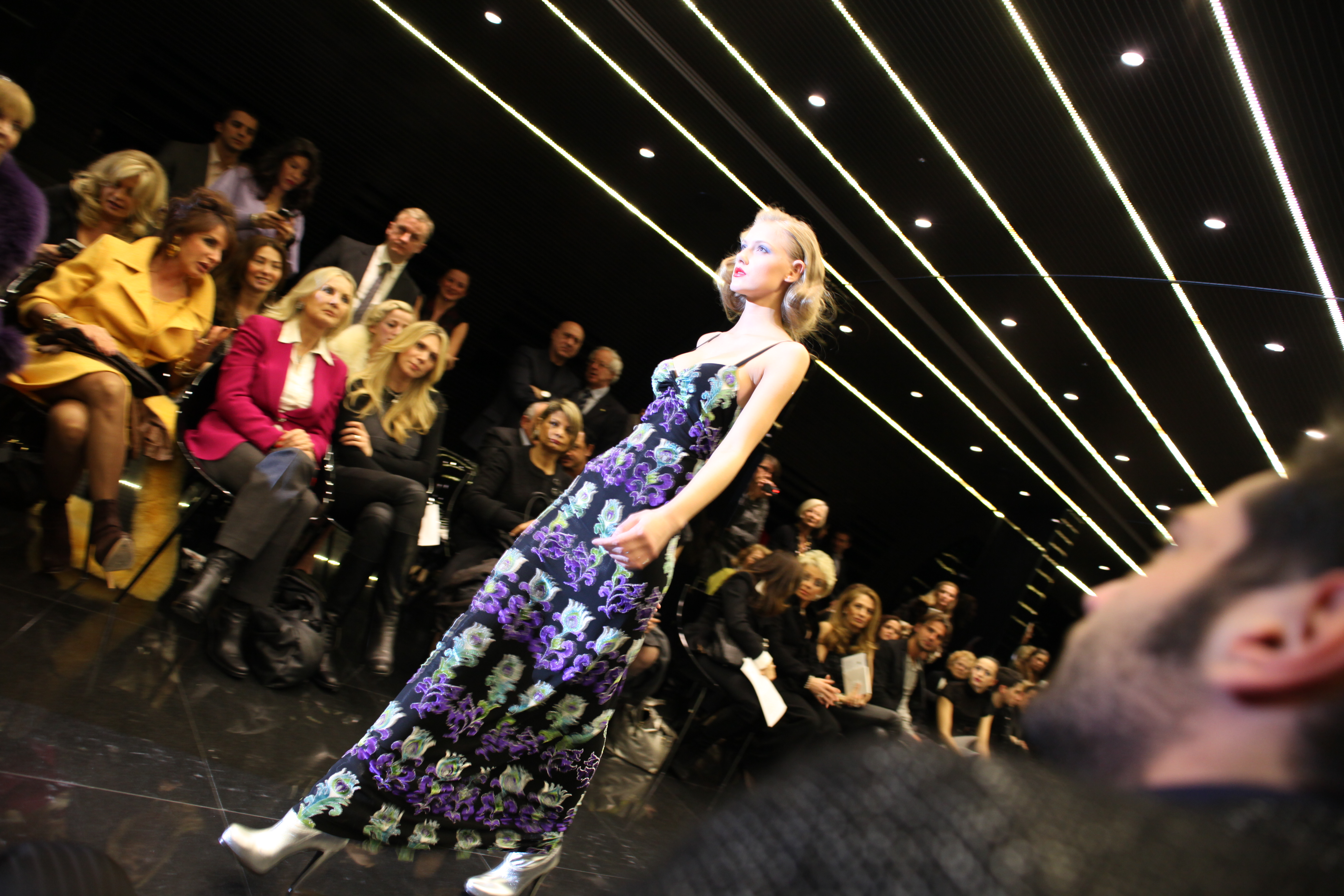
A photo of the runway from Milan Fashion Week 2013

Since 2009, Milan is regarded as the world fashion capital, or formally "Capital of Fashion Capitals," ruling New York, Paris, Rome and London. Most of the major Italian fashion brands, including Valentino, Armani, Versace, Prada and Dolce & Gabbana, are currently headquartered in the city. Milan also hosts a fashion week twice a year, similar to other international centers such as Paris, London, Tokyo, New York, Los Angeles and Rome.

Italian Ready-to-Wear has grown tremendously in Milan, in addition to the Fashion industry on a general note. Many economists don't pay a great deal attention to the fashion sector of the business in Milan. However, there is a great deal of quantitative weight being held by the fashion industry in terms of the economy of Milan, yet not much research has been conducted by historians or economists. The industrial center of Milan had been creating textiles and clothing for centuries, but it became an international superstar of fashion in 1970, and a leading international fashion hub or center.

== Companies in Milan ==
Milan is home to many of Italy's major corporations, including Italy's second largest bank (UniCredit) and the eyewear company Luxottica. Other major Milan-based corporations and banks include Borsa Italiana, Banca Popolare di Milano, Saipem, Vodafone Italy, Fastweb, Odeon TV, Fininvest, Prysmian Group, Edison, Esselunga, FinecoBank, Versace, La Rinascente, Prada, Etro, Pirelli, Compagnia Generale di Elettricità, 10 Corso Como, Valentino, canali, Armani, Missoni, Moschino, Telelombardia, RCS MediaGroup, Anfatis SpA and BBPR.

== Tourism ==
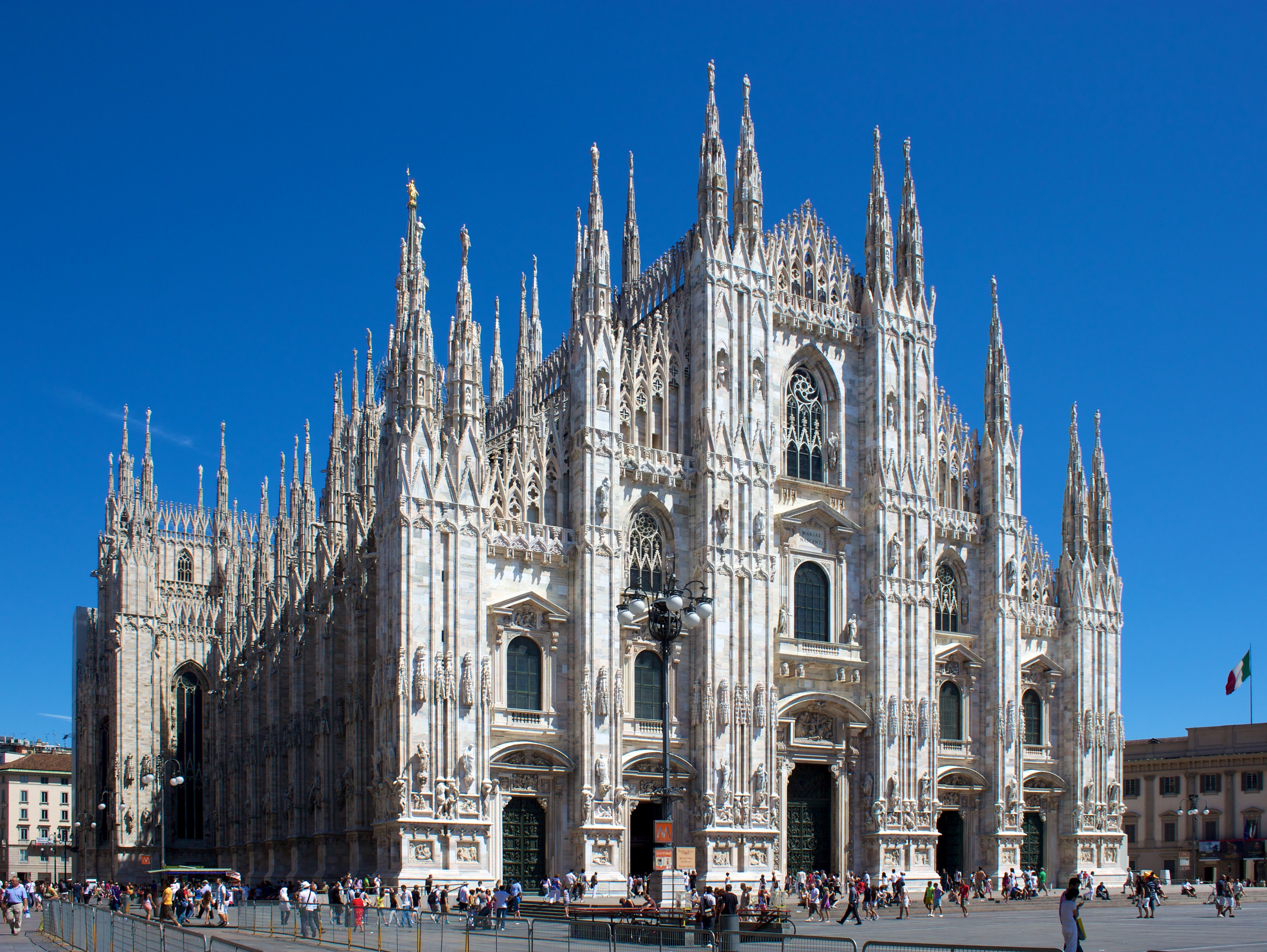
The Milan Cathedral is the city's most popular tourist destination.

Milan is one of the international tourism destinations, appearing among the forty most visited cities in the world, ranking second in Italy after Rome, fifth in Europe and sixteenth in the world. According to a particular source, 56% of international visitors to Milan are from Europe, whilst 44% of the city's tourists are Italian, and 56% are from abroad. The most important European Union markets are the United Kingdom (16%), Germany (9%) and France (6%).

According to a study, most of the visitors who come from the United States to the city go on business matters, whilst Chinese and Japanese tourists mainly take up the leisure segment. The city boasts several popular tourist attractions, such as the city's Duomo and Piazza, the Teatro alla Scala, the San Siro Stadium, the Galleria Vittorio Emanuele II, the Castello Sforzesco, the Pinacoteca di Brera and the Via Montenapoleone. Most tourists visit sights such as Milan Cathedral, the Castello Sforzesco and the Teatro alla Scala, however, other main sights such as the Basilica di Sant'Ambrogio, the Navigli and the Brera district are less visited and prove to be less popular.

Results from the same study also say that 60% of tourists who visit Milan are male, whilst 40% are female. Over 58% of visitors travel by air, and 26% by car.

The city also has numerous hotels, including the ultra-luxurious Town House Galleria, which is the world's first seven-star hotel according to Société Générale de Surveillance (five-star superior luxury according to state law, however) and one of The Leading Hotels of the World. The average stay for a tourist in the city is of 3.43 nights, whilst foreigners stay for longer periods of time, 77% of which stay for a 2-5 night average.

== Green economy ==
In addition to hosting fashion, service, banking, and industrial sectors, Milan contains companies involved in environmental and energy sectors. The city is home to approximately 350 active companies in areas including water, energy efficiency, air, external noise, renewable energy, and hydrogen. Additionally, about 30% of these companies in the metropolitan area conduct research and development, and the region records patent activity in energy efficiency.

In fact, in July 2014, the city of Milan hosted the first meeting of the European Employment and Environmental Ministers. Milan, looking to create new jobs for the nation with a rising unemployment rate, and have many of these jobs be in the environmental sector, such as those employment areas being linked to renewable energy, energy efficiency, development of green infrastructure, as well as waste reduction.

== See also ==
- Economy of Italy
