= Old Port of Marseille =

Coordinates: 43°17′41″N 5°22′15″E

Old Port of Marseille Vieux-Port de Marseille
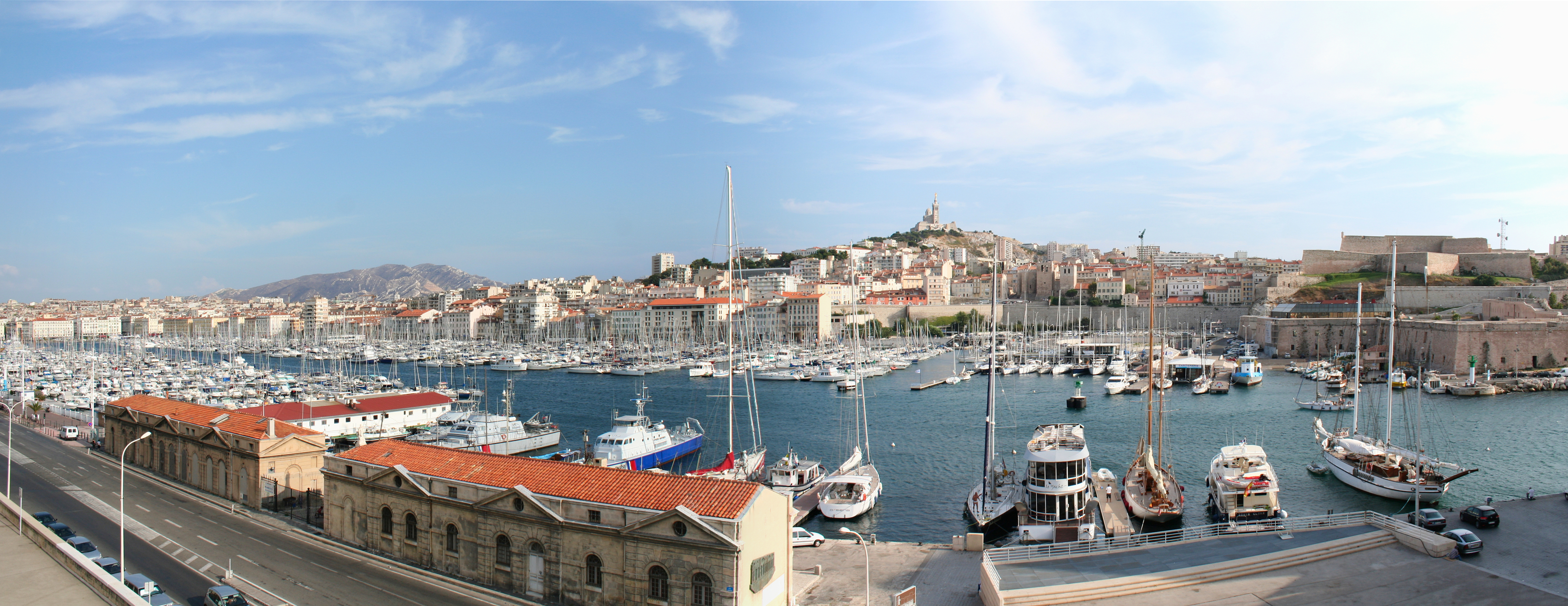
- The Old Port and the Basilica of Notre-Dame de la Garde (background, on the hill)
- Interactive map of Old Port of Marseille; Vieux-Port de Marseille

Location
- Country: France
- Location: Marseille

Details
- Opened: 6th century BC
- Operated by: City
- Owned by: State
- Type of Harbor: Natural
- Size of harbour: 200 000 square meters
- No. of berths: 3500
- Channel depth: 5 meters (16 ft)

The Old Port of Marseille (French: Vieux-Port de Marseille, [vjøpɔʁ də maʁsɛj]; Occitan: Vieu Port de Marselha) is at the end of the Canebière, the major street of Marseille. It has been the natural harbour of the city since antiquity and is now the main popular place in Marseille. It became mainly pedestrian in 2013.

== History ==
In 600 BC, Greek settlers from Phocaea landed in the Lacydon, a rocky Mediterranean cove, now the site of the Old Port of Marseille. They set up a trading post or emporion in the hills on the northern shore. Until the nineteenth century the Old Port remained the centre of maritime activity in Marseille. In the Middle Ages the land at the far end of the port was used to cultivate hemp for the local manufacture of rope for mariners, which is the origin of the name of the main thoroughfare of Marseille, the Canebière.

The great St. Victor's Abbey was gradually built between the third and ninth centuries on the hills to the south of the Old Port, on the site of a Hellenic burial ground.

Between the fifteenth and seventeenth centuries, quays were constructed under Louis XII and Louis XIII and an important shipyard for galleons put in place. Following a revolt against their governor by the citizens of Marseille, Louis XIV ordered the erection of the forts of St Jean and St Nicolas at the entrance to the harbour and established an arsenal and fleet in the Old Port itself. The notorious arsenal des galères was situated on the left side of the Old Port between the Cours Jean-Balard and the Cours Estienne-d'Orves: those condemned to be galley slaves in the royal war fleet were branded with the letters GAL.

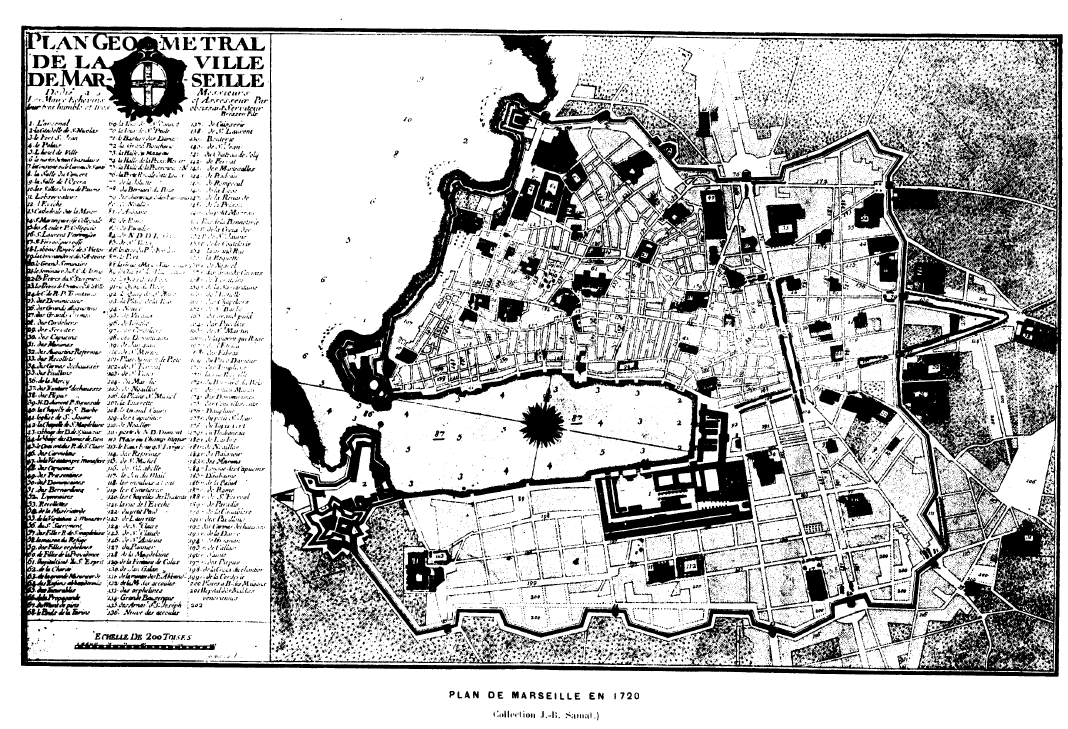
Map of Marseille, 1720

According to John Murray, in 1854 the Old Port had a capacity of between 1,000 and 1,200 ships. Roughly 18,000 merchant ships passed through the port each year, carrying about 20 million barrels worth of freight; this represented a quarter of the trade in Liverpool at the time. The 6 metre depth of the harbour, however, proved problematic for steamships later in the century; much deeper docks had to be constructed at La Joliette. In World War II the Old Port was left in complete ruins. According to eye-witness accounts, in January 1943, the Nazis, aided by the French police, dynamited much of the historic old town and demolished the gigantic aerial ferry or "transbordeur", an engineering tour de force that had become a major landmark of Marseille, comparable to the Eiffel Tower in Paris. This became known as the "Marseille roundup". In 1948 Fernand Pouillon was put in charge of the reconstruction of the devastated old quarter.

When, beginning in the 1840s, new harbour moles, quays and the Docks were built along the coast of the La Joliette quarter to the north-west, many port activities were moved out of the Old Port. Over time, new harbour installations were built further north-west, resulting in what is today the Grand Port Maritime de Marseille: continuous harbour installations as far as L'Estaque and the southern entrance to the Rove Tunnel, and "satellite" extensions around Fos-sur-Mer and along the shore of the Étang de Berre. The Old Port is used today as a marina, as a terminal for local boat trips, and hosts a local fish market. In 2013, for the European Capital of Culture, the Old Port was largely pedestrianized. It has been renovated as a large public square following an international competition won by Michel Desvigne Paysagistes, with Foster and Partners. The project is also to have a second phase with parks to be built around the port in 2020 for a sum of €64 million.

== In popular culture ==
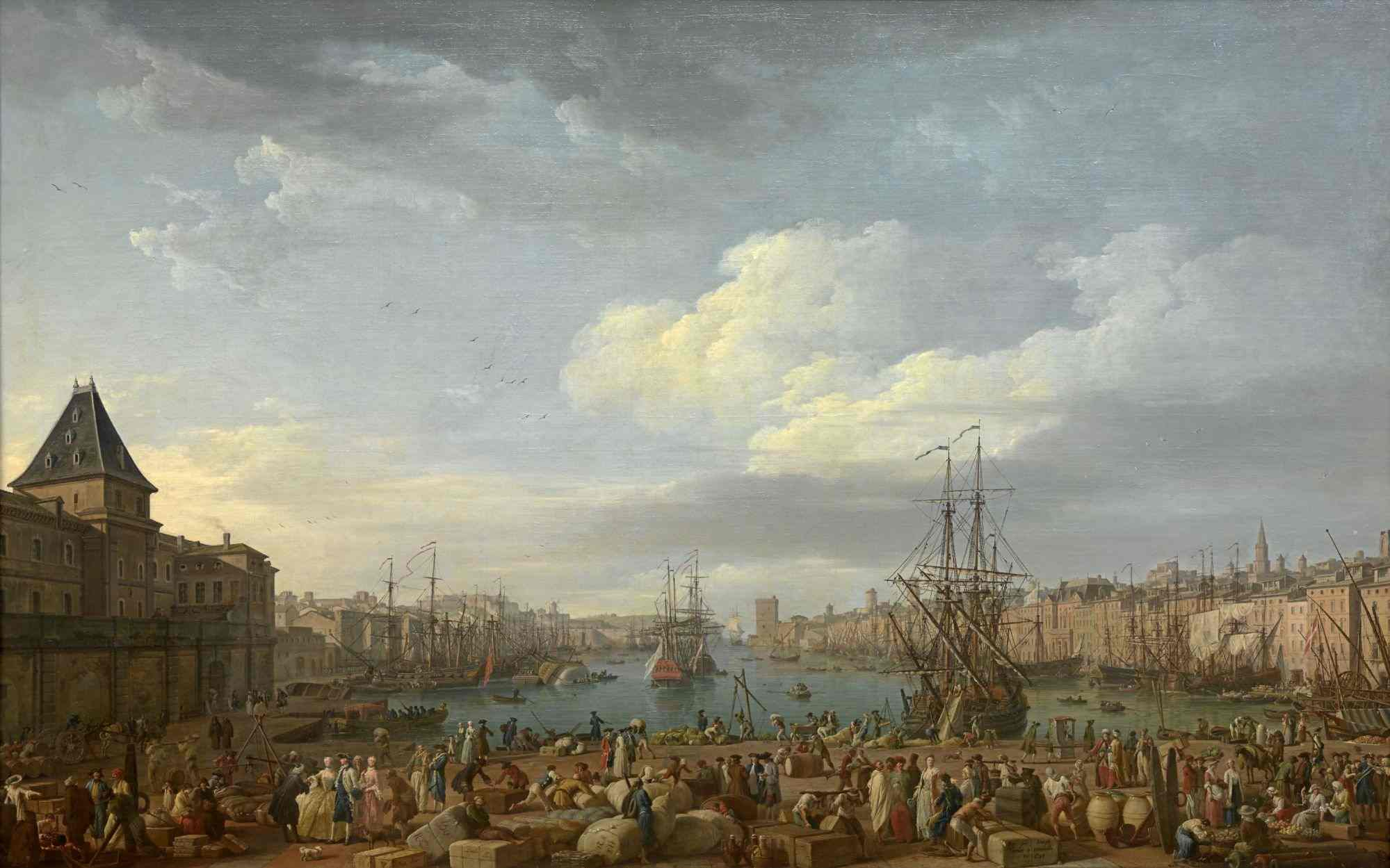
Interior of the Port of Marseille by Joseph Vernet, 1754

- The Count of Monte Cristo by Alexandre Dumas is set in the Old Port and on the Château d'If.
- Marius, Fanny and César, by Marcel Pagnol.
- Love Actually was partly filmed in the Bar de la Marine on the Old Port.
- Many of the bars and cafés around the Old Port are mentioned in the detective novels of Jean-Claude Izzo.
- Ian Fleming sets scenes in his James Bond novel On Her Majesty's Secret Service in and near the Old Port.
- Claude McKay in his 1929 novel "Banjo" follows the lives of expatriate Americans in La Joliette and explores perceptions of race and culture in Europe and the US.
- The Old Port is featured on film in both The French Connection and French Connection 2, starring Gene Hackman.
- Seven Thunders (US title: The Beasts of Marseilles), the 1957 black and white British film regarding Marseille in the Second World War, is set in the Old Port Quarter, and ends with the demolition of the quarter.

== Points of interest ==
- St. Victor's Abbey, on the south side of the Old Port, one of the oldest sites of Christian worship in France.
- the Phare de Sainte Marie, a lighthouse.
- the Canebière, situated at the far end of the Old Port on the Quai des Belges.
- the Hôtel de Ville (town hall).
- the historic ferry, plying between opposite sides of the Old Port.
- the Roman Dock Museum.
- the Musée des civilisations de l'Europe et de la Méditerranée, MUCEM (Museum of European and Mediterranean civilizations)

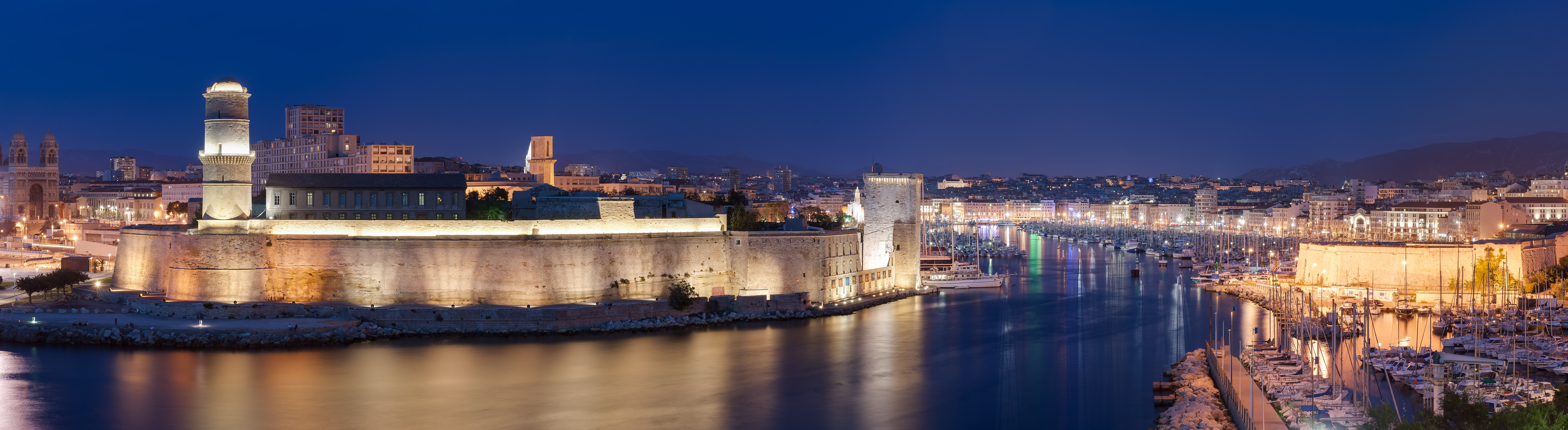
Old port of Marseille, at night, seen from the Pharo park

== Gallery ==
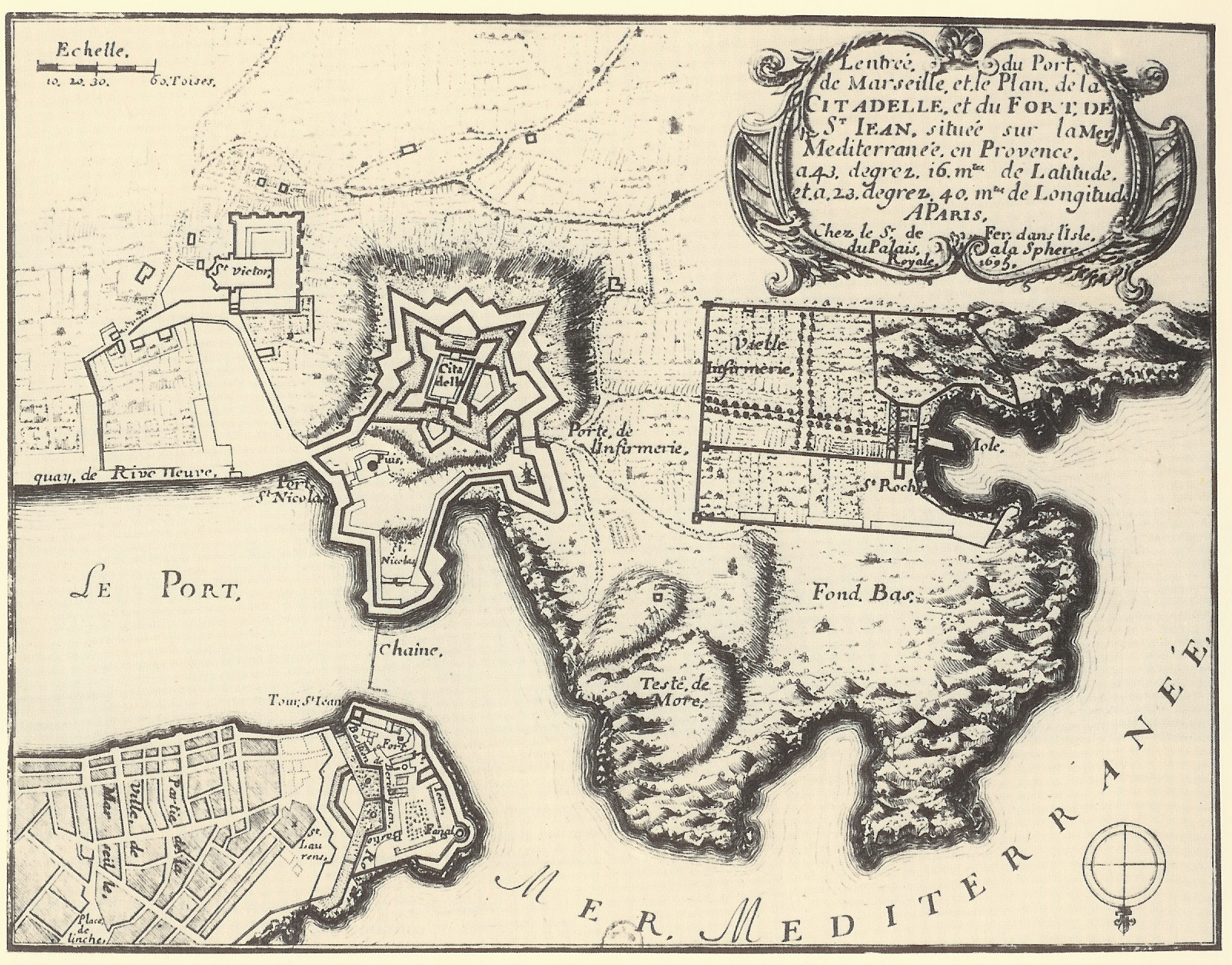
Entrance to the Old Port, 1695

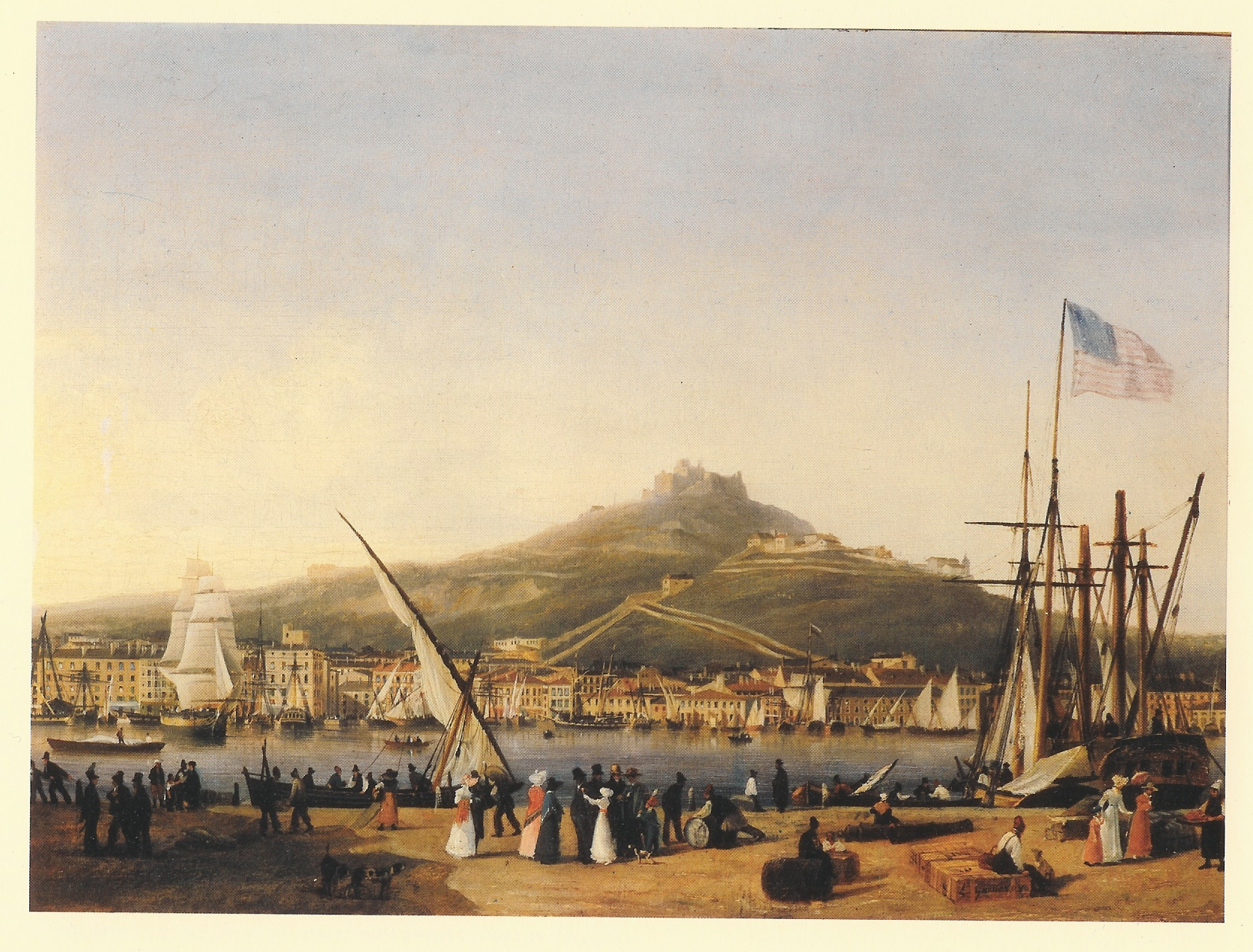
The Old Port from the Hotel de Ville, 1820

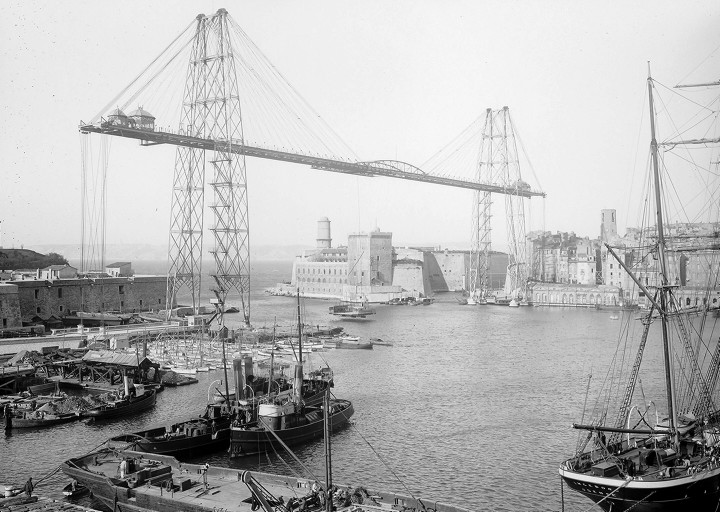
The "transbordeur" bridge

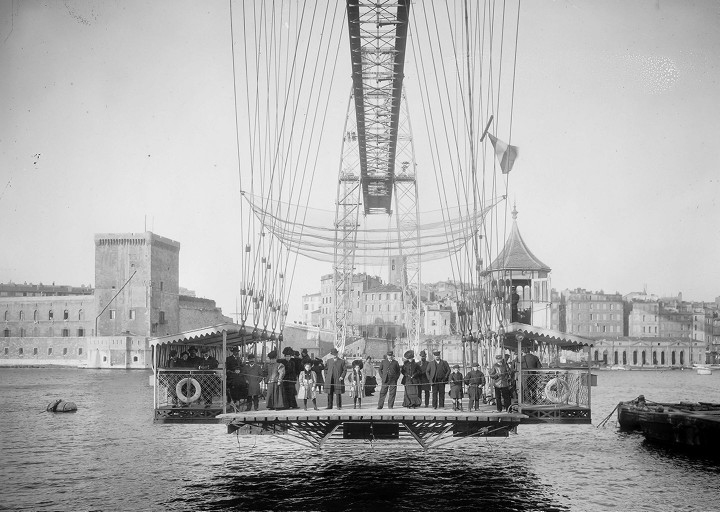
The aerial ferry on the "transbordeur"

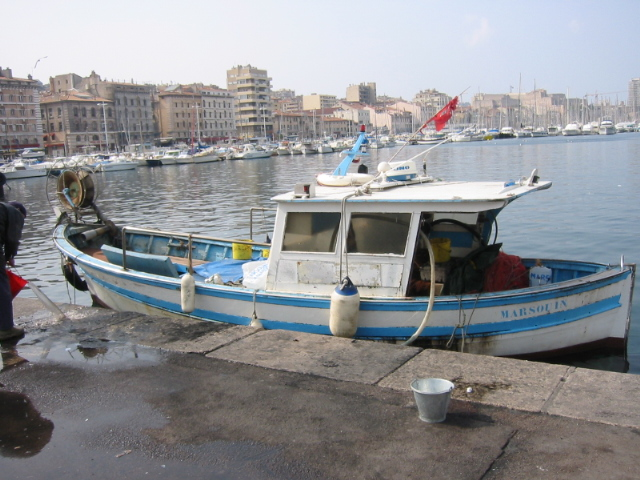
Traditional fishing boat on the Old Port

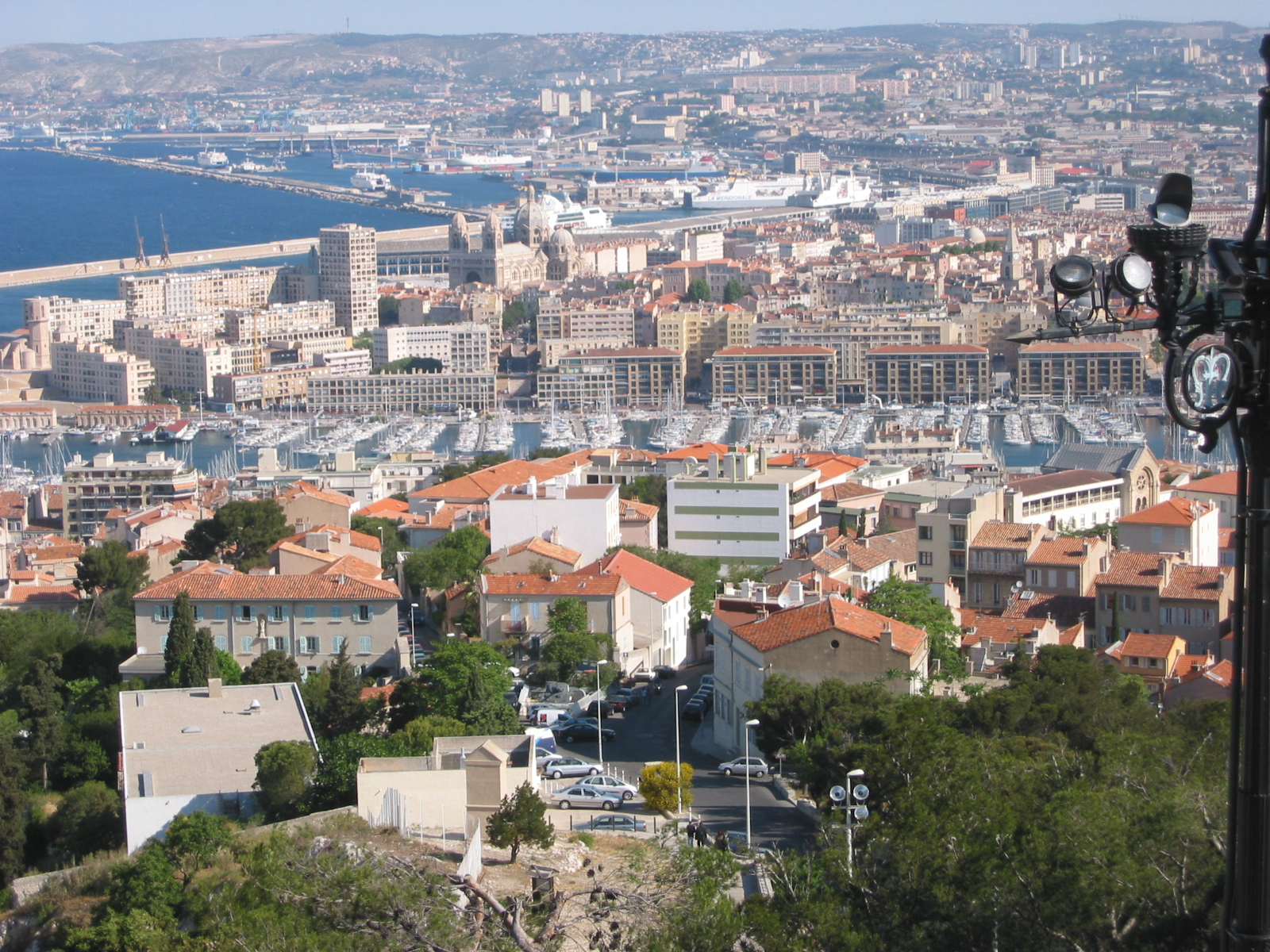
The ports of Marseille from Parc Puget

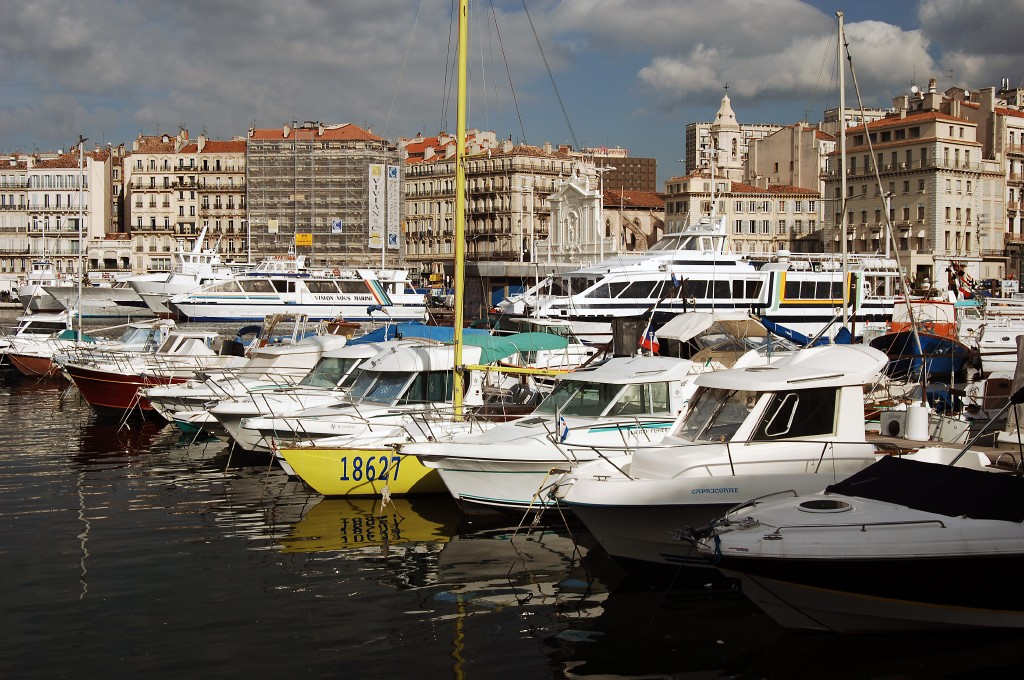
The Old Port in 2006

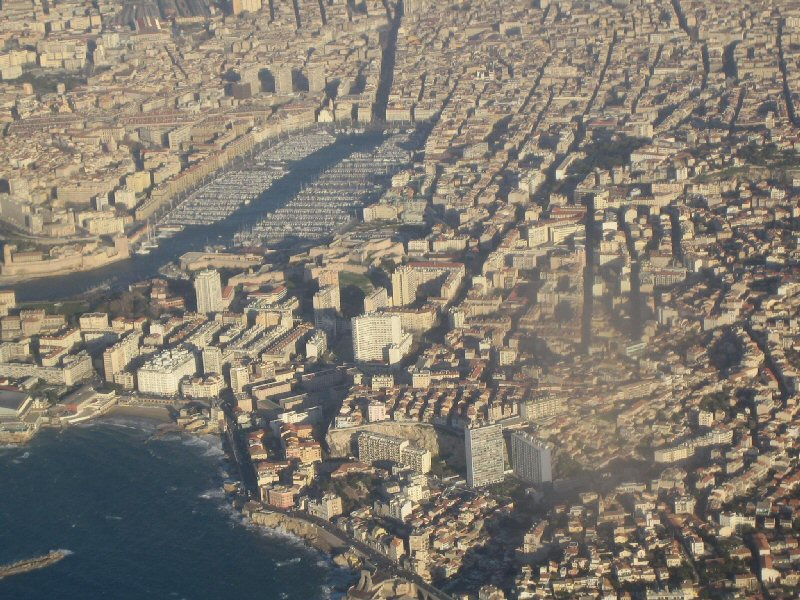
Aerial view of the Old Port

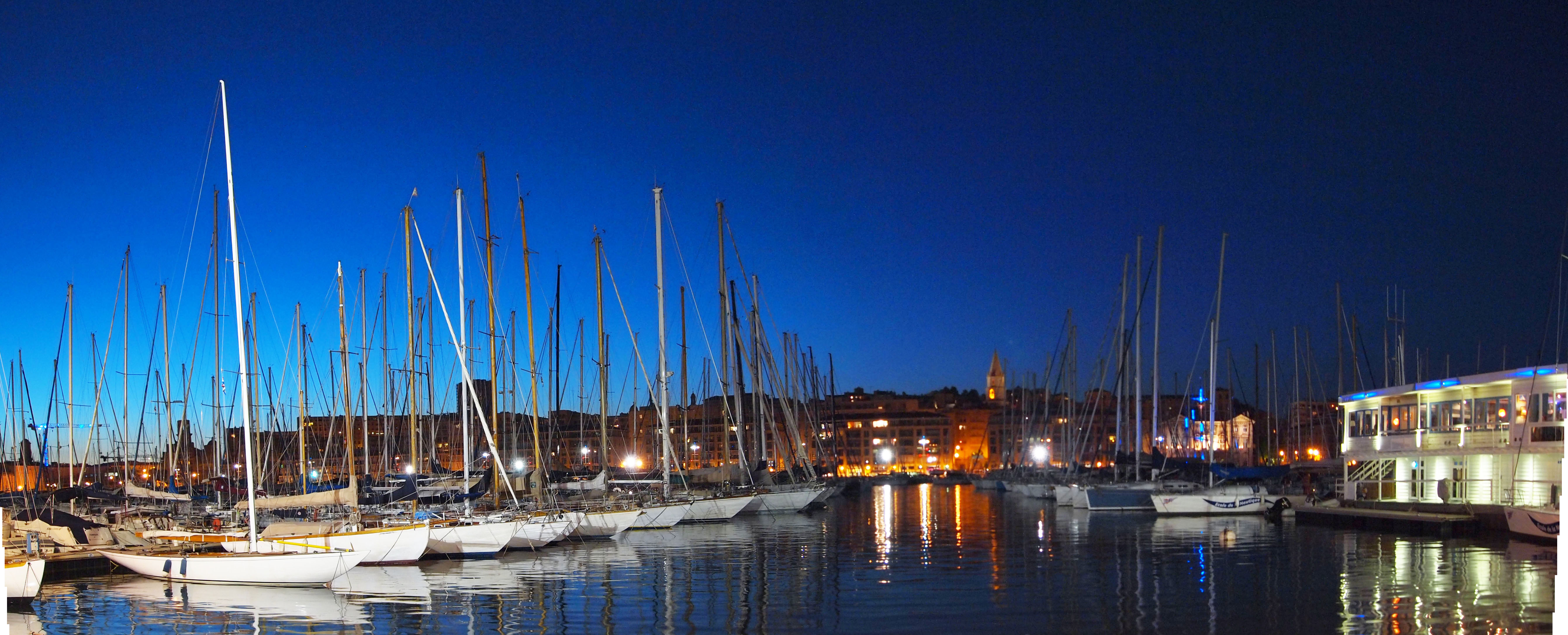
Old Port at night
