= Port Autonome =

Port Autonome is a French phrase referring to Autonomous ports and may refer to:

- The Autonomous Port of Abidjan, the chief port of Ivory Coast
- The Autonomous Port of Cotonou, one of the chief ports of Benin
- The Autonomous Port of Dakar, the chief port of Senegal
- ASC Port Autonome, a Senegalese football club based in Dakar
