= Yves Hayat =

French visual artist

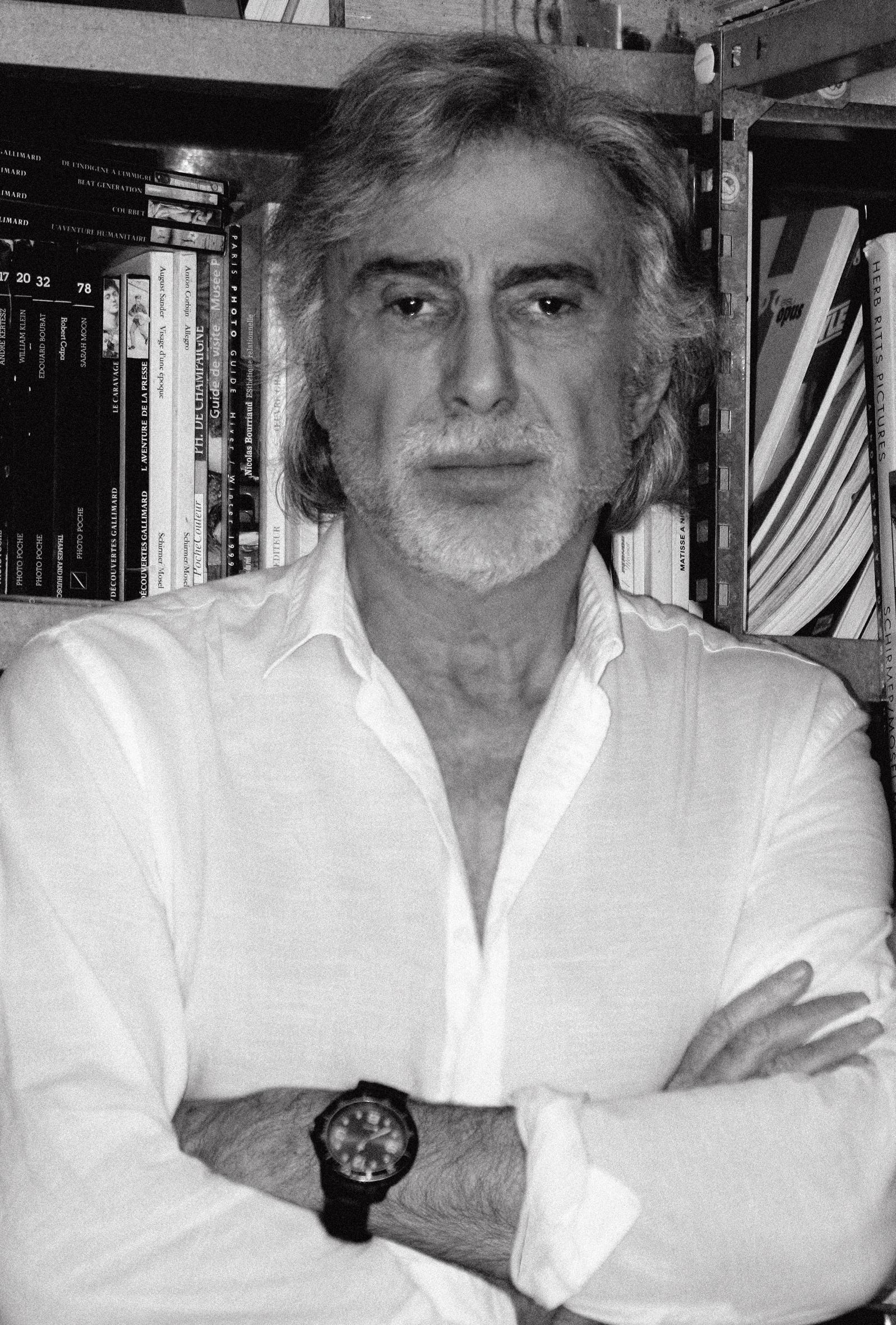
- Born: 1946 (age 79–80); Cairo, Egypt
- Education: Ecole Nationale supérieure des Arts Décoratifs de Nice
- Known for: Visual arts

Yves Hayat (born 1946 in Cairo, Egypt) is a French visual artist.

== Early life and career ==
Hayat was born in 1946 in Cairo, Egypt. After the Egyptian Revolution, he left Cairo with his family in 1956 to live in the South of France. In 1967, he started studying art at the Ecole Nationale supérieure des Arts Décoratifs de Nice. In the 1970s, he began a career in advertising and marketing. In 1996, he returned to art, which he practiced alongside his advertising career for several years, before devoting himself entirely to it in early 2000

Yves Hayat's art focuses on the current state of the world, of this ultra-media universe, of its domination by images, icons of appearance, luxury and violence. Using superimpositions, misappropriations and transparencies, Yves Hayat stages his works. He brings face to face beauty and horror, indifference and fanaticism, luxury and violence, confronting the viewer with the human ambivalence and the contradictions of this world

Yves Hayat lives between Paris and Nice, where he has his artist’s studio. Since 2006, he has exhibited his works internationally in London, New York, Istanbul, Paris, Monaco, Cologne, Geneva, Vienna, Kuwait and Beirut, among many others.

== Selected solo shows ==
=== Solo ===
- 2026, La fragilité des certitudes, Castang Art Project, Perpignan
- 2025, Ceci n'est pas une photo, Mark Hachem Gallery, Paris
- 2024, Profano vs. Sacro, Peter Frey Gallery, Verona, Italy
- 2023, Contemporary prisons, Mark Hachem gallery, Paris, Fr
- 2023: Weapons of mass seduction, Galerie Frey, Salzburg, Austria
- 2022: L'enfer du décor, Contemporary Art Center, Perpignan, Fr
- 2020: The Dark side of the dream, Galerie Frey, Vienna, Austria
- 2019: Il lato oscuro della felicità, Vento Blu Art Gallery, Polignano, Italy
- 2018: Femmes au bord de la crise de guerre, Galerie Mark Hachem, Paris, Fr
- 2018: Quid novi ?, Crypte de la Cathédrale, Grasse, Fr
- 2017: Le Parfum, cet obscur objet du désir, Musée International de la Parfumerie, Grasse, Fr
- 2017: L’Ultimo giorno prima dell’Eternità, San Silvestro al Quirinale, Rome, Italy
- 2016: Sale Temps, Galerie Mark Hachem, Paris, Fr
- 2015: Violent Luxury, Shirin Gallery NY, New York, USA
- 2015: Passion(s), Gaia Gallery, Istanbul, Turkey
- 2015: Transparencies, Art Space Gallery, London, UK
- 2014: Mythification/Mystifications, Mark Hachem Gallery, Beirut, Lebanon
- 2013: Yourope in Progress, Fondation Valmont - Palazzo Bonvicini, Venice, Italy
- 2010: TheNumber4 Gallery, Kuwait City, Kuwait
- 2009: L'illusoire réel et le réel illusoire, Galerie Bernard Mourier, Saint-Rémy-de-Provence, Fr
- 2008: Kamil Interior Design and Art Gallery, Monaco
- 2004: Statuts de femmes, Town hall of the 13th arrondissement of Paris, Paris, Fr
- 2006: Vénus/désastres, Sainte-Réparate Gallery, Nice, Fr
- 2006: Rapt, Alliance française de Montevideo, Montevideo, Uruguay
- 2006: Il y a une ombre au tableau, Maison de la Culture Roguet Saint Cyprien, Toulouse, Fr
- 2005: Terminus ou les Vanités contemporaines, Abbey, Valbonne, Fr
- 2002, Frère(s), VanRam Gallery, Ghent, Belgium
- 2001: Frère(s), Les Docks, Marseilles, Fr

=== Group ===
- 2022: Exode(s), Parcours Art Contemporain, Saint-Raphaël, Fr
- 2022: Mise en Cène, The R. Castang Collection, Chapelle du Quartier Haut, Sète, Fr
- 2022: Respirer l'art, International Museum of Perfumery, Grasse, Fr
- 2021: Passion particulière, Centre Internationald'Art Contemporain, Carros, Fr
- 2018: Summer group show, Ca' d'Oro, New York, USA
- 2016: Middle East Art Exhibition, Basel Art Center, Basel, Switzerland
- 2015: Vitraria Glass+A Museum, Palazzo Nani Mocenigo, Venice, Italy
- 2015: Maddox Gallery (Curated by James Nicholls), London
- 2014: Galerie der Moderne, Klosterneuburg Closter, Vienna
- 2014: Mises en scènes, Biennale, Château-Musée de Cagnes-sur-mer, Fr
- 2012: Vibrations totémiques, Château Royal de Collioures, Fr
- 2011: Zwischen Tür und Angel, Sigmund Freud Museum, Vienna
- 2010: Lateral Bodies, Spazio Thetis, Venice, Italy
- 2010: Clairs-obscurs, Château Musée Grimaldi, Cagnes-sur-mer, Fr
- 2007: L’Art en Capital “Sociétal / existentiel”, Grand Palais Paris, Fr
- 2007: Mémoires des enfants cachés, Masks video, Filgamesh Theatre, Festival d’Avignon, Avignon, Fr
- 2007: Freud... beau comme un symptôme, International Contemporary Art Center, Carros, Fr

=== International artfairs ===
Art Miami NewYork / Scope Basel / Art Central Hong Kong / Art Stage Singapore / Contemporary Istanbul / Art 16 London / Zona Maco Mexico / Art Dubai /...

== Exhibitions in museums and institutions ==
- 2024 Tejiendo identidades, diàlogos, huellas y futuro, Arte al Limite Museo, Valparaiso, Chile
- 2022: L'enfer du décor, Centre d'Art Contemporain, Perpignan, France
- 2021: Passions particulières, Centre International d'art Contemporain, Carros, France
- 2018: Quid novi ? Crypt of the Cathedral of Grasse, France
- 2017: Le Parfum, cet obscur objet du désir, Musée International de la Parfumerie de Grasse, France
- 2017: L’Ultimo giorno prima dell’ Eternità, Chiesa San Silvestro al Quirinale Rome, Italy
- 2016: Middle East Art Exhibition, Basel Art Center, Basel, Swiss
- 2015: Vitraria Glass+A Museum, Palazzo Nani Mocenigo, Venice, Italy
- 2014: Galerie der Moderne, Klosterneuburg Closter, Vienna, Austria

== Collections ==
- Triptyque Crucifixion, Klosterneuburg Monastery, Austria
- Triptyque Fleurs blessées, International Museum of Perfumery, Grasse, France
- Retable Palestine, «Mise en Cène» collection of Roger Castang, Perpignan, France
- Babel, Musée de la Palestine en exil (Institut du Monde Arabe), Paris
- Concerto facciale, Copelouzos Art Museum, Athens.
- La Confusion des sentiments Installation, Fernando Galan Art.es collection, Madrid
- Concerto facciale triptych, Arte Al Limite MUSEO, Chile.

== Gallery ==
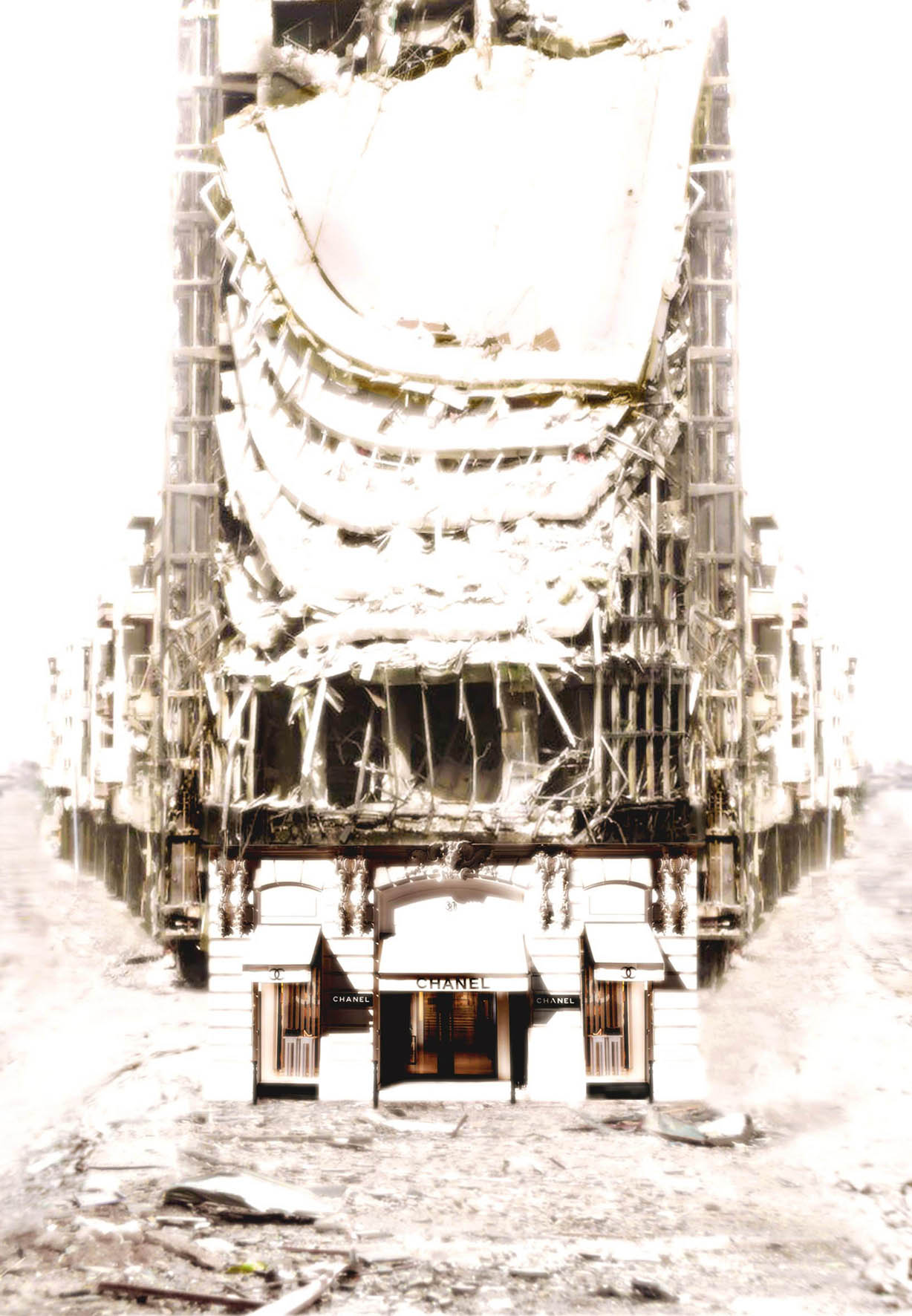

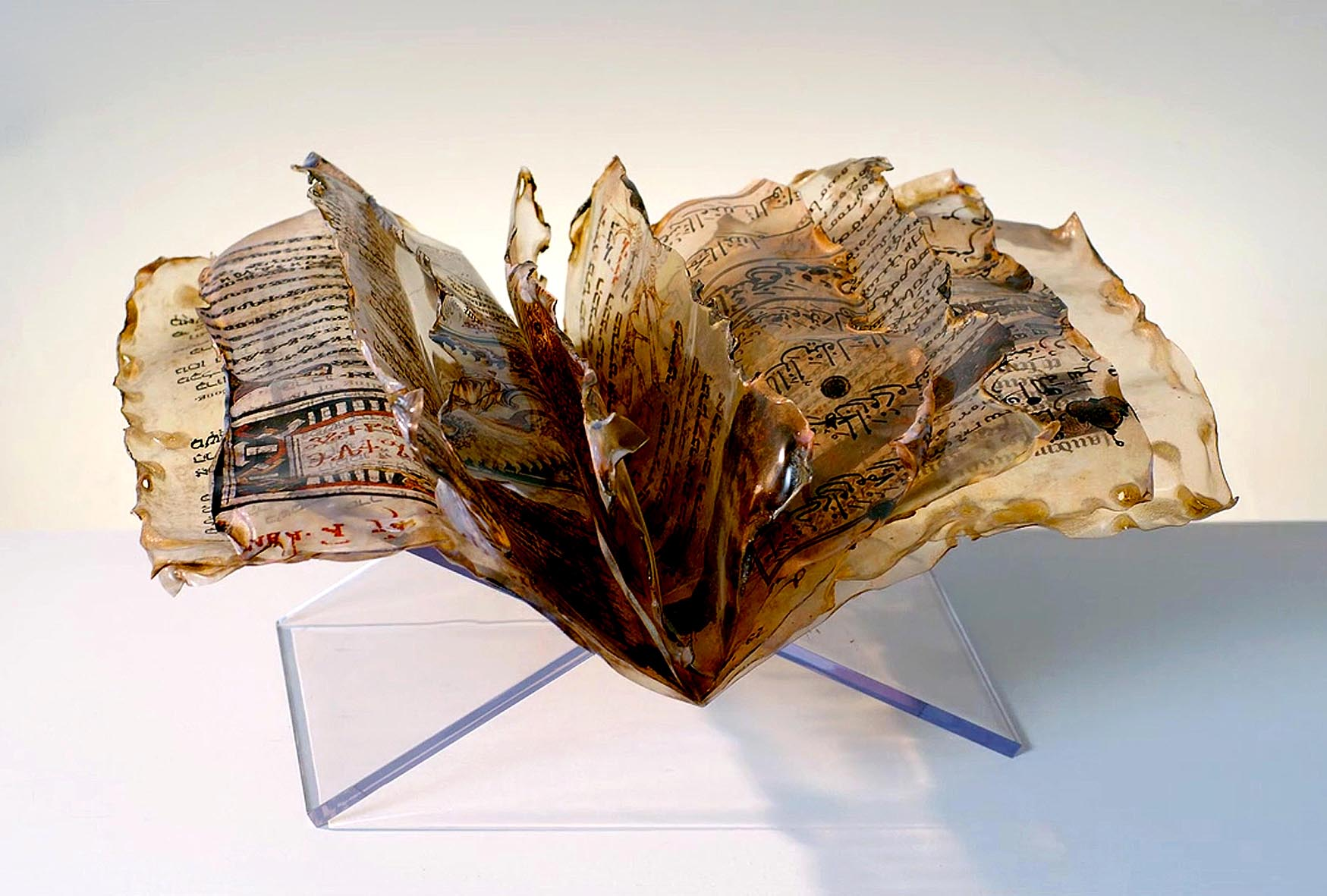

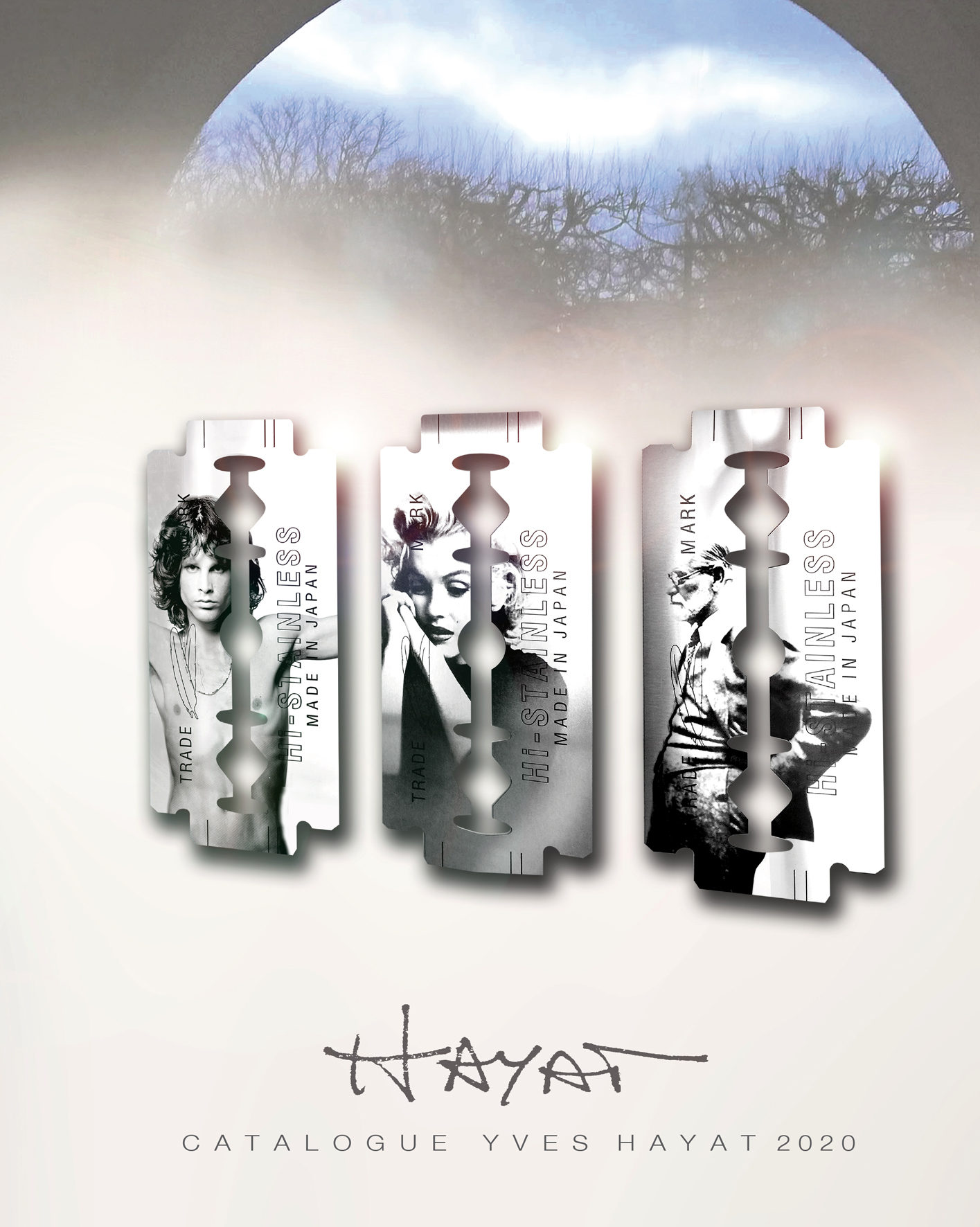

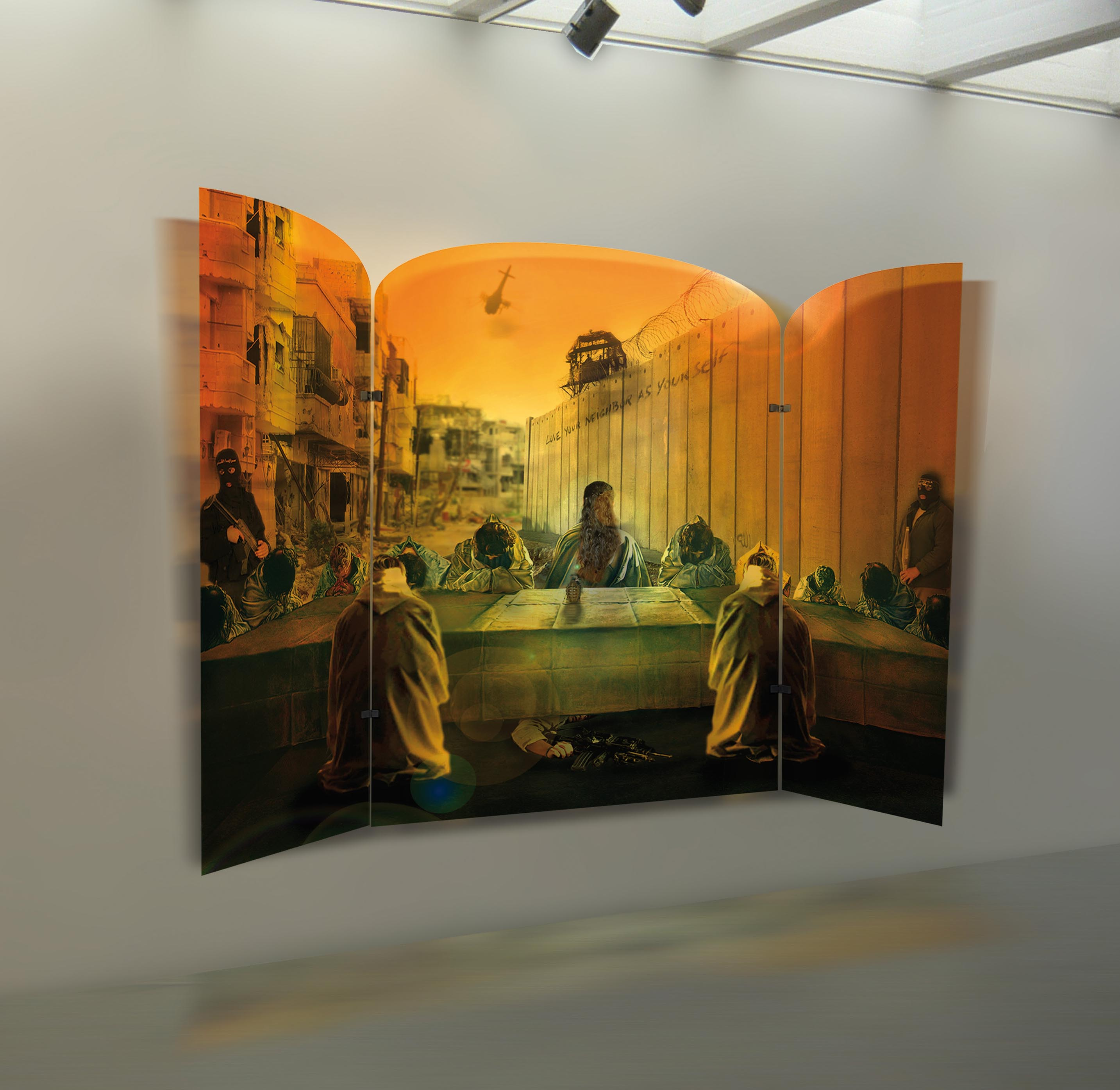
