= Phare de Sainte-Marie =

Phare de Sainte Marie
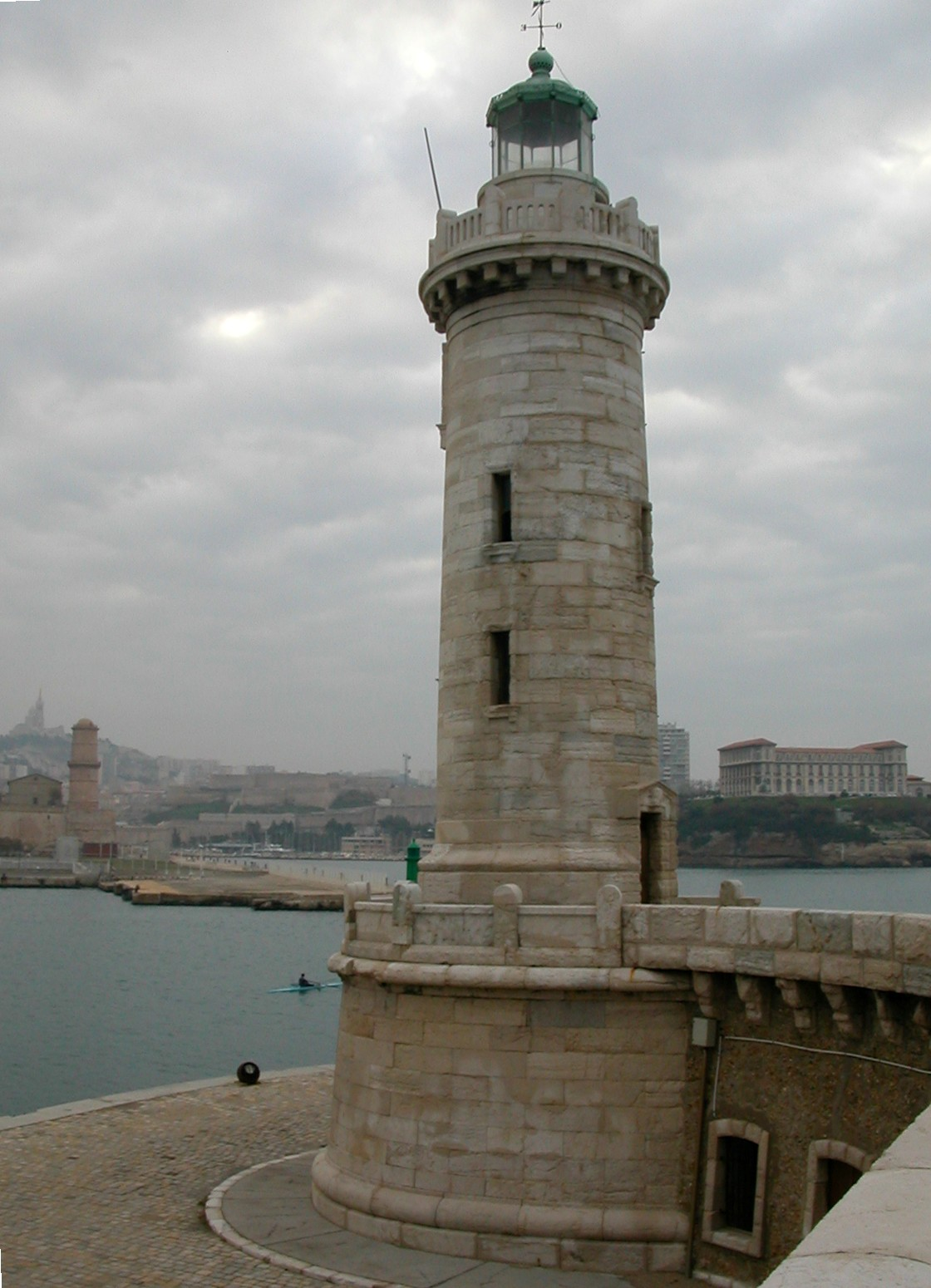
- Location: Old Port of Marseille; France
- Coordinates: 43°17′57.7″N 5°21′29.3″E

Tower
- Constructed: 1855
- Construction: limestone tower
- Height: 21.3 metres (70 ft)
- Shape: cylindrical tower with lantern and gallery
- Markings: unpainted tower, greenish lantern
- Heritage: listed in the general inventory of cultural heritage

The Phare de Sainte-Marie is an inactive lighthouse built to mark the harbor of Marseille, France. Completed in 1855, it is made of natural-finished local limestone and stands 70 feet high. It is located at the north side of the Passe de la Joliette. This is at the southern entrance to the series of bassins that form the harbor. It was upgraded to electrical illumination in 1922 but is now inactive.

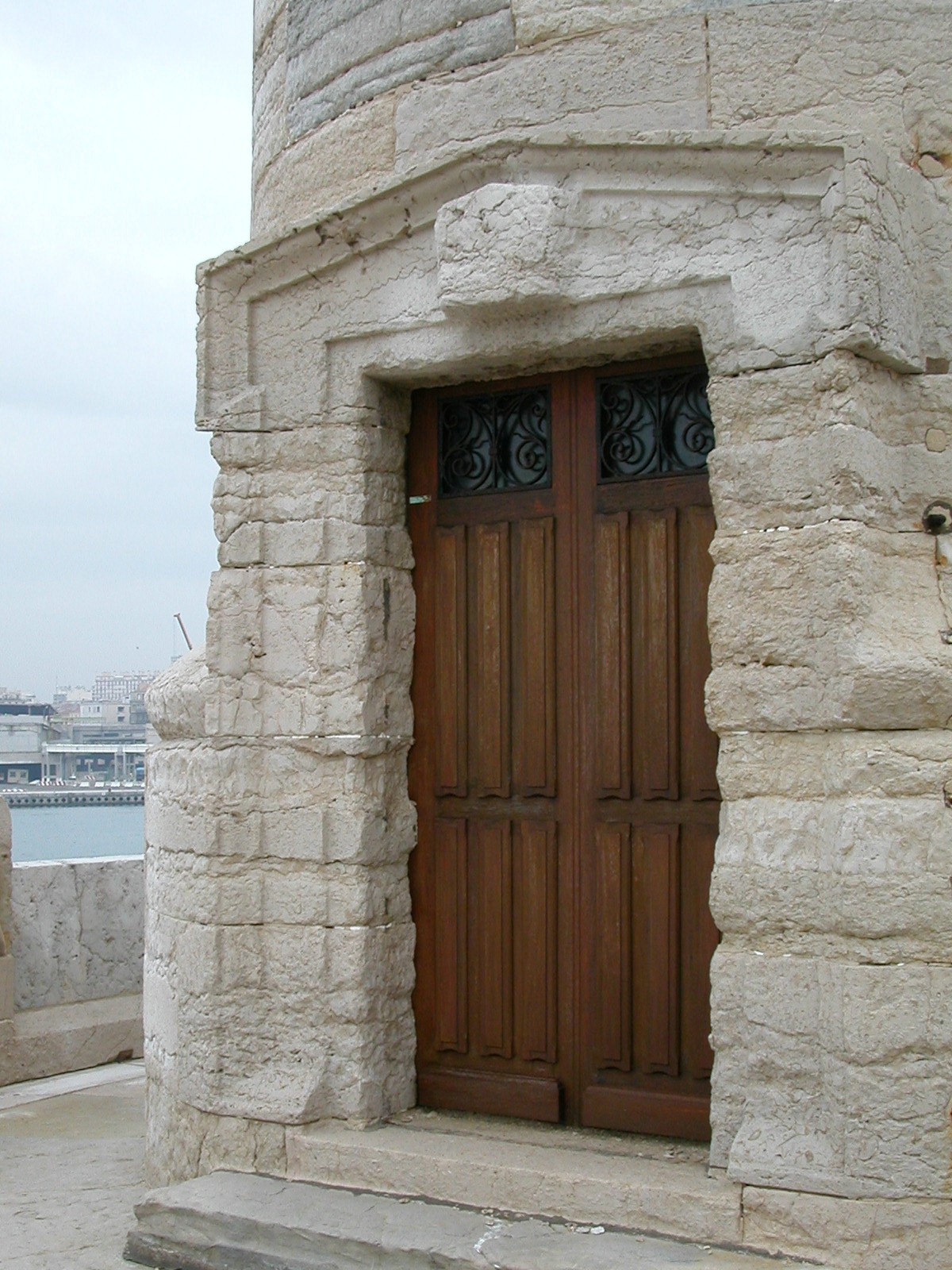
Door detail

This lighthouse was a featured clue box destination for teams to find on the fourth season of the reality television show, The Amazing Race.

== See also ==
- List of lighthouses in France
