= Marseille-Fos Port =

Marseille Fos port
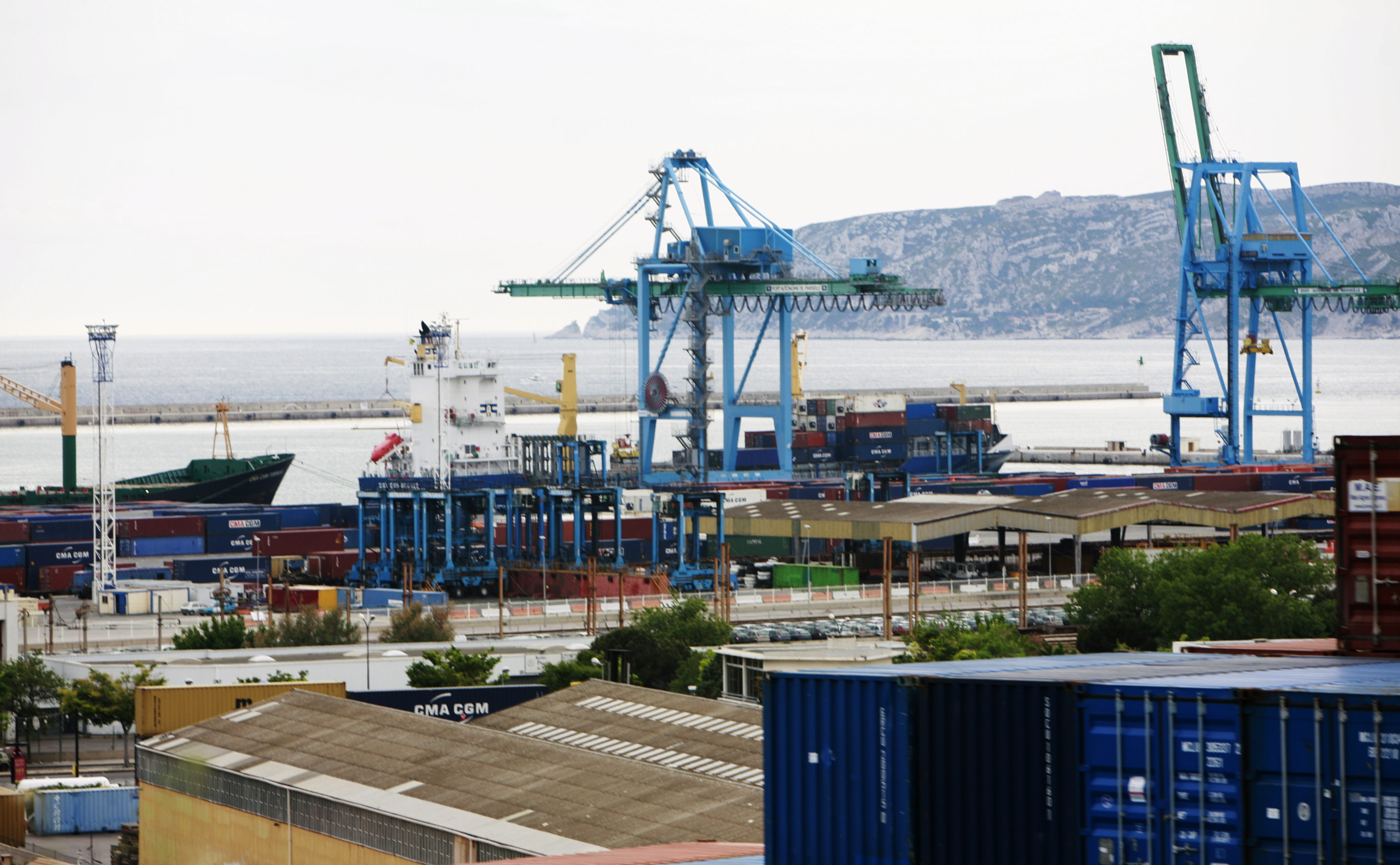
- Container ship in the east basin (Marseille)
- Interactive map of Marseille Fos port

Location
- Country: France
- Location: Marseille, Fos-sur-Mer
- Coordinates: 43°20′31″N 5°20′10″E

Details
- Opened: 15th century (quays construction)
- Type of Harbor: grand port maritime
- Employees: 41,500

Statistics
- Vessel arrivals: ~10,000 (2019)
- Annual cargo tonnage: ▼79 million tonnes (2019)
- Annual container volume: ▲1,454,621 TEU (2019)
- Passenger traffic: ▲3.1 million (2019)
- Website marseille-port.fr

Marseille-Fos Port (French: Grand port maritime de Marseille, lit. 'Great Seaport of Marseille'; Occitan: Grand Port de Marselha) is the main trade seaport of France. In 2011, the port had an overall traffic of 88 million tons. It is the tenth-largest cruise port in the world and the third-largest in the Mediterranean.

It has two main sites: in northern Marseille from La Joliette to l'Estaque as well as in Fos-sur-Mer, about 50 km (31 mi) north west of Marseille. The port generates 41,500 jobs has an annual turnover of €169.5 million and a traffic of €4 billion according to an OECD study.

The port is the biggest French port, the third biggest Mediterranean port and the seventh biggest European port, transporting 79 million tons of goods in 2019, making it the 41st port in the world.

== History ==
Historically the Old Port of Marseille functioned as the city's primary port. In the 1840s, maritime traffic becomes too intense for its capacities and an extension seemed necessary. As second port of France, the issue was too important and the national government took action, passing a law on August 5, 1844, toward the construction of a new basin at la Joliette, to the north of the Old Port, through an ambitious project (13 million francs). The construction of the large mole used concrete block techniques. The Joliette infrastructures began to be used in 1847. The basin was fully completed in 1853.

The Development Council for the metropolitan area of Marseille-Provence has studied the creation of a technopole, or technoport, to redynamise the port activities. It would include the capacity to repair ships over 270 m (885 ft or 295 yd) long, offshore wind turbines and other innovative technologies.

== Traffic statistics ==
Port traffic
	General cargo (tons)	Containers (TEU)	Passengers
2010	86 M	953,435	2.06 M
2011	88 M	944,047	2.3 M
2012	85.79 M	1,062,408	2.4 M
2014	78.52 M	1,179,910	2.5 M
2018	80.45 M	1,407,387	3.01 M
2019	78.89 M	1,454,621	3.13 M
