= Euroméditerranée =

Urban project in Marseille, France

Coordinates: 43.315039°N 5.364972°E

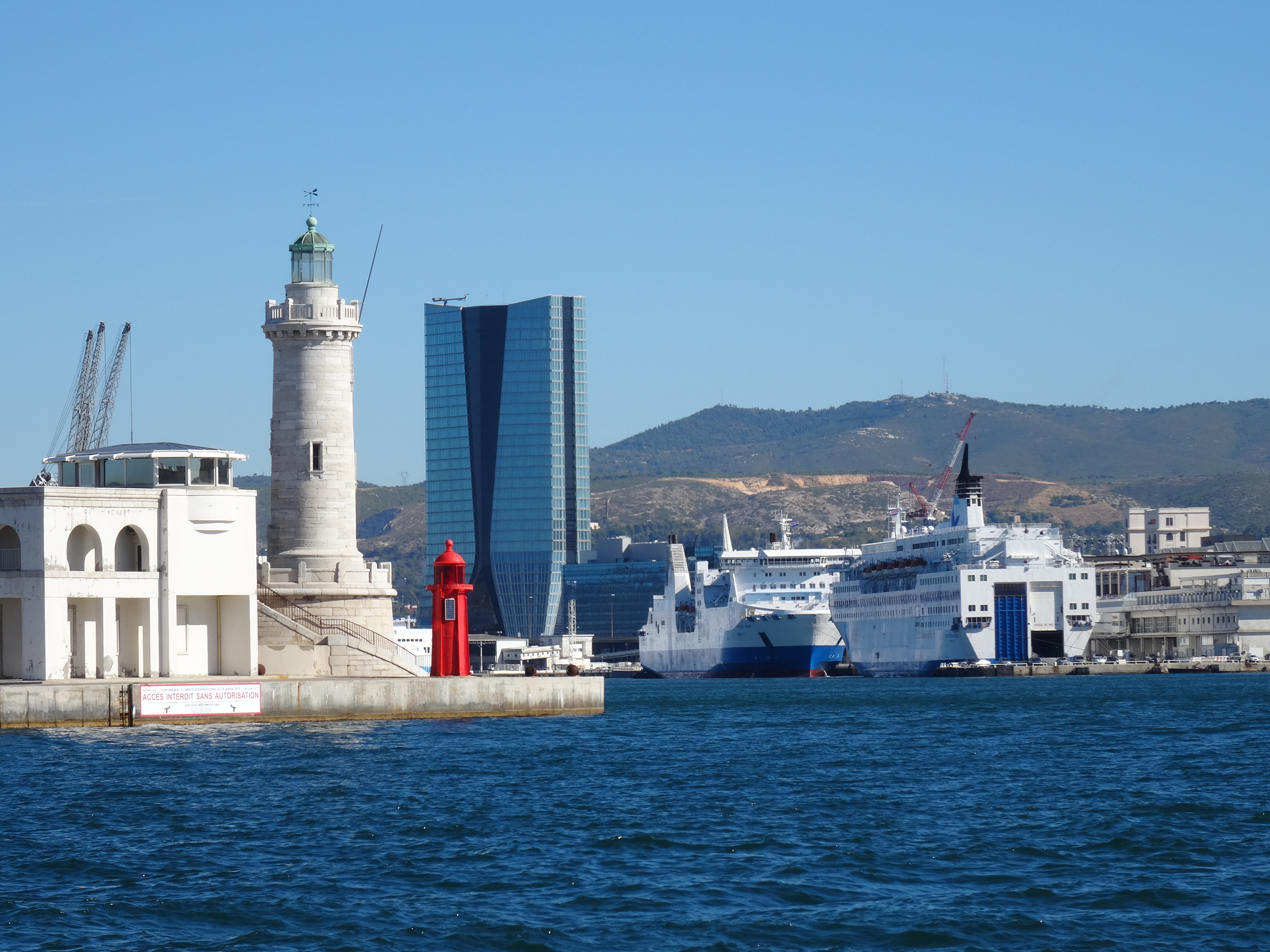
A view of the CMA CGM Tower, now a major landmark in Marseille.

Euroméditerranée (French pronunciation: [øʁɔmeditɛʁane]) is an urban renewal project underway in Marseille to create an ecodistrict in the neighbourhood of La Joliette.

== History ==
The project was launched in 1995 with the initiative of Mayor Robert Vigouroux and the State. The agreement for the establishment of a public agency of development was signed in 1994, working on an area of 310 hectares. Since 2007, Euroméditerranée Act 2 has extended the scope to 170 new hectares north. This project is funded by the European Union, the State, the Regional Council, the Departmental Council, the urban community and the City of Marseille.

The Euroméditerranée eco-district is home to the Thassalia project, Europe's first geothermal marine power station, which uses the waters of the Mediterranean to cool buildings in the summer and warm them in the winter.

== Projects ==
Among the achievements of Euroméditerranée figure: the Museum of European and Mediterranean Civilisations (MuCEM) and adjacent Villa Méditerranée, the Docks renovation into offices, the renovation of the Silo into a theatre, the renovation of the Rue de la République, as well as the construction of the CMA CGM Tower (33 floors, 147 metres). The budget of the project amounts to €7 billion investment, of which €5 billion of private investment.
