= CMA CGM Tower =

Skyscraper in Marseille, France

Coordinates: 43.315041°N 5.365841°E

- Tour CMA-CGM
- CMA CGM Tower in Marseille, France
- Interactive map of the CMA CGM Tower area

General information
- Status: Completed
- Type: Office
- Location: Marseille, France
- Construction started: July 2006
- Opening: September 2011
- Owner: CMA CGM

Height
- Roof: 147 m (482 ft)

Technical details
- Floor count: 33
- Floor area: 94,000 m^{2} (58,000 m^{2} tower and 36,000 m^{2} annex)
- Lifts/elevators: 20

Design and construction
- Architect: Zaha Hadid
- Structural engineer: Arup

The CMA CGM Tower is a 147-metre (482 ft) tall skyscraper in Euroméditerranée, the central business district of Marseille, France. Designed by Zaha Hadid, it is the headquarters for CMA CGM, one of the world's major freight companies, hosting 2,200 employees in the office previously spread over seven sites.

Zaha Hadid was selected to design the building in November 2004, and it became her first tower. It is intended to interact with other landmarks of the city including the Château d'If and the basilica of Notre-Dame de la Garde, which stands taller than the tower on a rocky outcrop. Built by Vinci subsidiary GTM Construction, the building has 15 lifts to service its 33 floors and was completed in September 2011.

== History ==
The purpose of the Euroméditerranée public development establishment is to restructure several districts adjoining the port of Marseille, and the tower is the first major project on the site. Its construction was motivated by the former CEO of CMA CGM, Jacques Saadé, whose company found itself cramped in the building which today adjoins the tower and which was bought by the general council of Bouches-du-Rhône.

The construction work for this tower began in July 2006. The foundations were completed in March 2007; the foundation stone laying ceremony followed on the 23rd of that month.

The core reached the 33rd and final floor at the end of June 2008. The concrete works were completed in October 2008; the end of work on the exterior facades took place in May 2009; and the end of the installation of the exterior coverings occurred in August 2009.

The delivery of the building, initially planned for the third quarter of 2009, had been postponed to the fourth quarter of 2010.

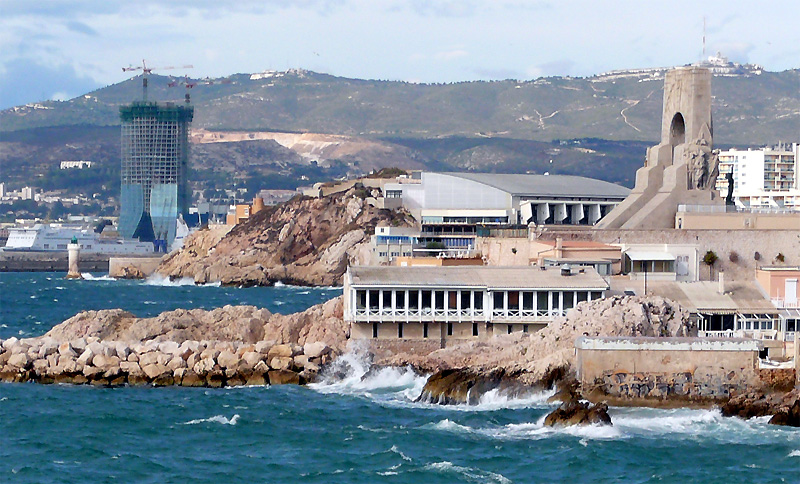
The tower under construction in 2008, seen from Endoume
