= Autonomous port =

An autonomous port (or independent port) (French: port autonome) is a state-owned enterprise or an organization managing a port area, with a legal entity and enjoying managerial autonomy vis-à-vis its supervision. In general, autonomous ports are state-run. In France, either the state authorities, regional authorities, or local authorities are responsible for the port facilities. If the country allows, these ports can potentially own their land and maritime domain. This type of organization may operate its own tools and terminals, but these are often concessioned to a private port operator. It is rare for a port to run itself; the job is generally given to independent organizations, but they have strong links to the authority, and are still referred to as "autonomous ports" in French-speaking countries.

== In the world ==
=== France ===
In the French system, this type of port is a public institution of the State jointly exercising administrative and public service missions and industrial and commercial public service missions. Autonomous ports are managed as "public establishments of industrial and commercial character" (French: établissement public à caractère industriel et commercial ( acronymized as "EPIC")). Under the supervision of the French Ministry of Transport, it enjoys considerable autonomy of management, like any public institution in the country.

Autonomous ports handle the port facilities located within its district (river or sea). They are responsible for the operation and the harbor police, works of extension and improvement, and also manages its property, which can be important. French autonomous ports are allocated land they occupy, unlike the major seaports who now own (except for the natural area).

In France, the autonomous port status was established by a 1920 law and was applied originally to a port in Bordeaux and a port in Le Havre. Following reforms in 1965, four other ports were created (Dunkerque, Rouen, Nantes-Saint-Nazaire, Marseille).the port in La Rochelle was created in 2006.

In 2008, the government led by François Fillon announced the transformation of metropolitan autonomous ports into major seaports. This new status was intended to bring about privatization and opening up to competition of handling equipment, which had been previously run exclusively by the country's autonomous ports. The bill was passed.

Therefore, the only ports that retain the "autonomous port" status are metropolitan river ports and overseas seaports.

Excluding the large seaports, the most important ports in the state jurisdictions have the status of autonomous ports

Autonomous ports are administered by a board of directors and led by a director. Other commercial ports and the most important fishing ports are typically managed either by a Chamber of Commerce and Industry, or by delegation of the department, region or community group.

Other fishing ports are often managed by municipalities or professional organizations (cooperatives).

=== Francophone West Africa ===
There are many seaports in West Africa. They use the same system that France uses..Many are state-run.

== List of autonomous ports ==
In Metropolitan France :

- Port autonome de Paris
- Port autonome de Strasbourg
- Autonomous Port of Mulhouse-Rhin

In Overseas parts of France :

- Autonomous Port of Papeete
- Autonomous Port of New Caledonia

In French-speaking Africa :

- Autonomous Port of Djibouti
- Autonomous Port of Abidjan
- Autonomous Port of Cotonou
- Autonomous Port of Dakar
- Autonomous Port of Lomé
- Autonomous Port of Conakry
- Autonomous Port of San-Pédro, Ivory Coast
- Tangier Mediterranean Autonomous Port

In Cameroon

- Autonomous Port of Douala
- Autonomous Port of Kribi
- Autonomous Port of Limbé
- Autonomous Port of Garoua

In Canada

- Autonomous Port of Valleyfield

In Cambodia :

- Sihanoukville Autonomous Port
- Phnom Penh Autonomous Port

== See also ==
- Free port
