= Docks (Marseille) =

Historical building in La Joliette, Marseille, France

Coordinates: 43°18′25″N 5°21′59″E

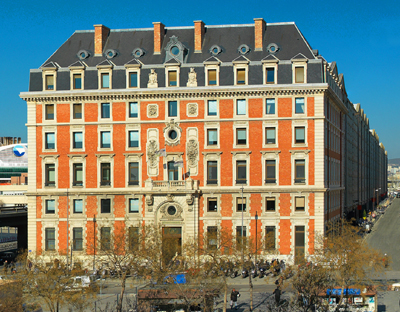
Hôtel de Direction facade

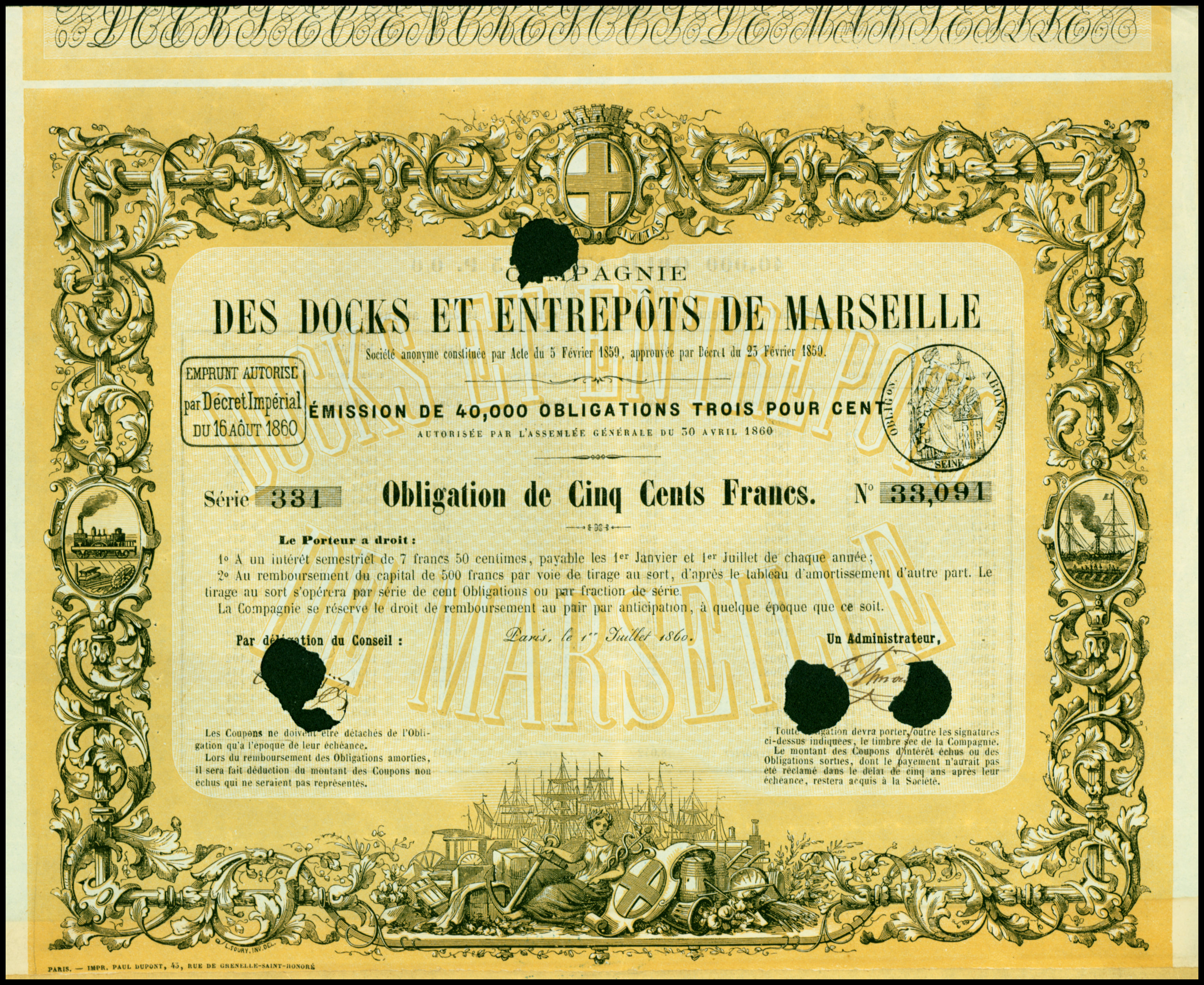
Bond of the Compagnie des Docks et Entrepôts de Marseille, issued 1 July 1860

Les Docks de Marseille (Occitan: Los Dòcs de Marselha) is a historical building in the heart of La Joliette, a business district in Marseille, France. The building is home to 220 companies employing some 3,500 people. Various corporate headquarters, regional branches, restaurants, and services are located inside.

== History ==
Compagnie des Docks et Entrepôts de Marseille, run by Paulin Talabot, a Corps des Ponts et Chaussées (Bridges and Roads) chief engineer, politician, and successful businessman, launched the project of Les Docks de Marseille in 1856. Built under the direction of the architect Gustave Desplaces from 1858 to 1863, Les Docks de Marseille had 4 warehouses each displaying its own courtyard as well as a management building named "Hôtel de Direction".

In 1955, Entrepôts et Magasins Généraux de Paris (EMGP) took over Compagnie des Docks et Entrepôts de Marseille. Initially, Les Docks were used as a paper and wheat storage facility, later they were equipped with refrigerated chambers and finally, they were partially restructured into offices.

SARI, managed by la Défense real estate developer Christian Pellerin, bought Les Docks de Marseille in 1991. The architect, Eric Castaldi, led a refurbishing project that transformed the warehouses into offices. Some of the work carried out included preserving the brick arches, enlarging the windows, replacing part of the roof with glass to create atriums, and adding an internal central street.

The Docks renovation into offices is amongst the achievements of Euroméditerranée. In 2009, the ground-floors of the Docks have been refurbished by Alfonso Femia (with studio 5+1AA / AF517*) for Constructa Urban Systems and JP Morgan Asset Management with SECMO, Garcia Engineering, R2M and Vinci-Dumez Méditerranée. From 2015, they have been welcoming restaurants and craft shops from the Region of Marseilles.
