= La Joliette =

Neighborhood in Marseille, France

Coordinates: 43.3050°N 5.3669°E

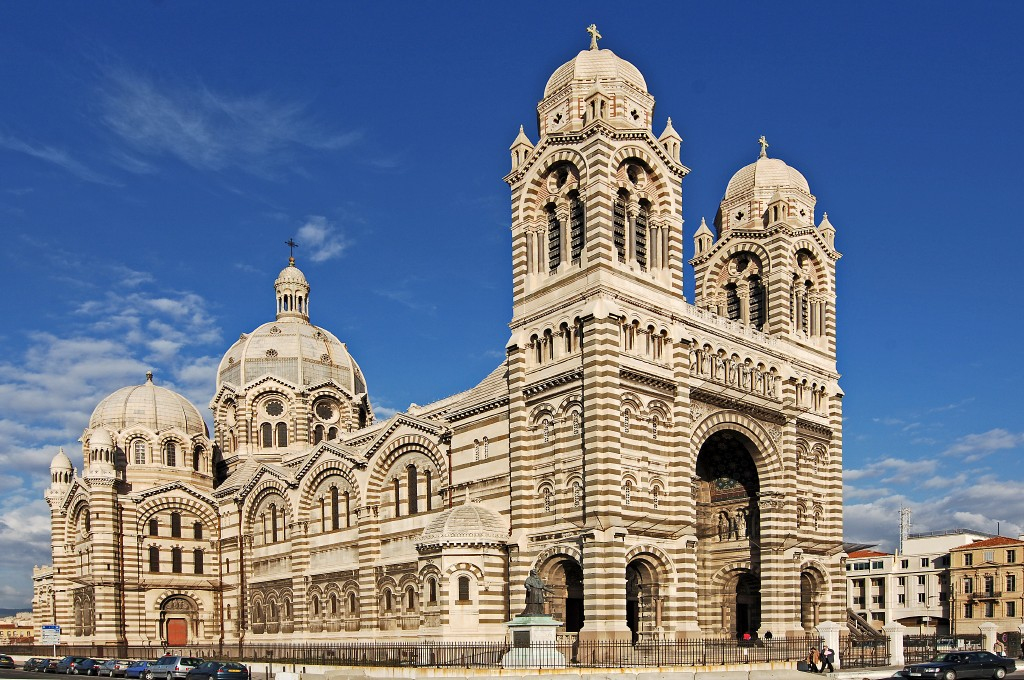
Cathédrale de la Major

La Joliette (French pronunciation: [la ʒɔljɛt]; Occitan: La Jolieta) is a neighbourhood of the 2nd arrondissement of Marseille located at the start of the autonomous port of Marseille.

== Overview ==
It contains the Docks de Marseille and Marseille Cathedral.

The area is the centre of the Euroméditerranée project, aimed at creating a business district.

Public Transport:

Métro line 2 : Station Joliette (exit République and Place de la Joliette)

Tram ligne 2 : Stations Joliette (Boulevard de Dunkerque) and Euroméditerranée Gantès (Boulevard de Dunkerque)

Currently, the tramline is being extended to Arenc.

== See also ==
Neighbourhood of 2nd arrondissement of Marseille
