= Prix André Baboin =

Flat horse race in France

Prix André Baboin Grand Prix des Provinces
- Class: Listed
- Location: Various, France
- Inaugurated: 1982
- Race type: Flat / Thoroughbred
- Website: france-galop.com

Race information
- Distance: 1,900 / 2,000 metres
- Surface: Turf
- Track: Various
- Qualification: Four-years-old and up exc Group race winners this year
- Weight: 57 kg Allowances; 1½ kg for fillies and mares 1½ kg if not Group placed * Penalties; 2 kg for Listed winners or G2 2nd/3rd placed * * since January 1
- Purse: €52,000 (2018); 1st: €26,000

The Prix André Baboin is a Listed flat horse race in France open to thoroughbreds aged three years or older. It is run at various racecourses over distances of around 2,000 metres (1¼ miles), and it is scheduled to take place each year in October.

== History ==
The event was established in 1982, and it was originally called the Grand Prix des Provinces. Instead of having a permanent venue, it was designed to alternate between the main regional racecourses of France. The first three editions were held at Bordeaux le Bouscat, Lyon-Parilly and Marseille-Borély.

The early runnings of the Grand Prix des Provinces were contested over 2,000 metres. The event was given Group 3 status in 1984.

The race was renamed in memory of André Baboin in 1986. Baboin served as the chairman of the Société des Courses de Lyon, and was also a committee member of the Société d'Encouragement. He died in 1985.

The Prix André Baboin was extended to 2,200 metres in 1987. It was restored to 2,000 metres in 1993. Its original sequence of venues — Bordeaux, Lyon and Marseille — was repeated until 2000. It was staged at Toulouse in 2001.

The event was switched between Lyon and Bordeaux between 2002 and 2011, and returned to Marseille-Borély in 2012. The 2013 running took place at Bordeaux again, followed by Lyon in 2014. Its distance at Bordeaux is now 1,900 metres. In 2015 the race was run at Angers and it returned to Lyon in 2016, then Bordeaux in 2017 and Marseilles in 2018. It was downgraded to Listed status in 2018.

== Records ==
Most successful horse:

- no horse has won this race more than once

Leading jockey (3 wins):

- Gérald Mossé – Partipral (1994), Astarabad (1997), Right Wing (2000)
- Olivier Peslier – Parme (1995), Homeland (2001), Doctor Dino (2006)

Leading trainer (3 wins):

- Alain de Royer-Dupré – Lowell (1989), Astarabad (1997), Valentino (2004)
- Élie Lellouche – Our Account (1990), Parme (1995), Starlish (2009)
- François Rohaut – Homeland (2001), Sign of the Wolf (2003), Bal de la Rose (2007)
- Jean-Claude Rouget – Flanaghan Cocktail (1991), Kadance Ville (1999), Zafiro (2017)

Leading owner (2 wins):

- Gary Tanaka – Homeland (2001), Caesarion (2002)

== Winners ==
Year	Winner	Age	Jockey	Trainer	Owner	Time
1982	Darly	3	Alain Lequeux	David Smaga	Georges Blizniansky
1983	Dayzaan	7	Freddy Head	André Fabre	Peter Baumgartner
1984	Monjal	3	Jean-Luc Kessas	Bernard Sécly	Salomon Sawicka
1985	Pylades	3	Alain Junk	Charlie Milbank	Egon Wanke
1986	Yaka	3	Alain Badel	Alain Chelet	Mrs Arthur Dewez
1987	Grand Fleuve	3	Maurice Philipperon	John Cunnington Jr.	Paul de Moussac
1988	Vaguely Pleasant	6	Dominique Boeuf	Patrick Biancone	André Ben Lassin
1989	Lowell	3	William Mongil	Alain de Royer-Dupré	Marquesa de Moratalla	2:16.80
1990	Our Account	6	Philippe Bruneau	Élie Lellouche	Denis Krief
1991	Flanaghan Cocktail	3	Philippe Dumortier	Jean-Claude Rouget	Jean-Michel Lorca
1992	Oumnaz	3	Norbert Jeanpierre	Xavier Betron	Ecurie Belles Provinces
1993	Marildo	6	Guy Guignard	David Smaga	David Smaga
1994	Partipral	5	Gérald Mossé	M. Delcher Sánchez	Enrique Sarasola
1995	Parme	4	Olivier Peslier	Élie Lellouche	Daniel Wildenstein	2:06.30
1996	Artan	4	Peter Schiergen	Martin Rölke	Stall Brandenburg	2:08.00
1997	Astarabad	3	Gérald Mossé	Alain de Royer-Dupré	HH Aga Khan IV
1998	Great Dane	3	Kieren Fallon	Henry Cecil	Greenbay Stables Ltd	2:16.80
1999	Kadance Ville	4	Jean-René Dubosc	Jean-Claude Rouget	Serge Boucheron	2:00.90
2000	Right Wing	6	Gérald Mossé	John Dunlop	8th Earl Cadogan	2:01.20
2001	Homeland	3	Olivier Peslier	François Rohaut	Gary Tanaka	2:03.60
2002	Caesarion	3	Stéphane Pasquier	Jean de Roualle	Gary Tanaka	2:16.08
2003	Sign of the Wolf	3	François-Xavier Bertras	François Rohaut	Andrew Crichton	2:09.00
2004	Valentino	5	Ioritz Mendizabal	Alain de Royer-Dupré	Fierro / Forien	2:05.00
2005	Laverock	3	Miguel Blancpain	Carlos Laffon-Parias	Maktoum Al Maktoum	2:12.57
2006	Doctor Dino	4	Olivier Peslier	Richard Gibson	Martinez Salmean / Nanni	2:03.30
2007	Bal de la Rose	3	Stéphane Pasquier	François Rohaut	Berend van Dalfsen	2:13.63
2008	Chopastair	7	Jean-Bernard Eyquem	Thierry Lemer	Ivoula / Blazy	2:02.94
2009	Starlish	4	Anthony Crastus	Élie Lellouche	Mrs Daniel Malingue	2:13.86
2010	Zibimix	6	Gregory Benoist	Xavier Nakkachdji	Antoine Boucher	2:03.25
2011	Akarlina	5	Thierry Thulliez	Nicolas Clément	Ecurie Mister Ess A S	2:12.01
2012	Mobaco	3	Remi Fradet	Frédéric Rossi	Jean-Claude Seroul	2:03.34
2013	Celtic Rock	4	José-Luis Martinez	José Carlos Fernandez	M de l A Maestre Torres	2:06.66
2014	Dartagnan D'Azur	5	Mickael Barzalona	Werner Hefter	Stall Donna	2:19.22
2015	Beautiful Heroine	4	Pierre-Charles Boudot	Francis-Henri Graffard	Nikolay Shurupov	2:03.58
2016	Subway Dancer	4	Radek Koplik	Zdeno Koplik	Bonanza	2:14.87
2017	Zafiro	5	Jean-Bernard Eyquem	Jean-Claude Rouget	Ecurie Antonio Caro	2:04.79
2018	Star Victory	7	Anthony Crastus	J-L Dubord	Gold and Blue Limited	2:09.52

== Distance and venue ==
- 1982: 2,000m, Bordeaux le Bouscat
- 1983: 2,000m, Lyon-Parilly
- 1984: 2,000m, Marseille-Borély
- 1985: 2,000m, Bordeaux le Bouscat
- 1986: 2,200m, Lyon-Parilly
- 1987: 2,200m, Marseille-Borély
- 1988: 2,200m, Bordeaux le Bouscat
- 1989: 2,200m, Lyon-Parilly
- 1990: 2,200m, Marseille-Borély
- 1991: 2,200m, Bordeaux le Bouscat
- 1992: 2,200m, Lyon-Parilly
- 1993: 2,000m, Marseille-Borély
- 1994: 1,900m, Bordeaux le Bouscat
- 1995: 2,000m, Lyon-Parilly
- 1996: 2,000m, Marseille-Borély
- 1997: 1,900m, Bordeaux le Bouscat
- 1998: 2,000m, Lyon-Parilly
- 1999: 2,000m, Marseille-Borély
- 2000: 1,900m, Bordeaux le Bouscat
- 2001: 2,000m, Toulouse
- 2002: 2,000m, Lyon-Parilly
- 2003: 2,000m, Lyon-Parilly
- 2004: 1,900m, Bordeaux le Bouscat
- 2005: 2,000m, Lyon-Parilly
- 2006: 1,900m, Bordeaux le Bouscat
- 2007: 2,000m, Lyon-Parilly
- 2008: 1,900m, Bordeaux le Bouscat
- 2009: 2,000m, Lyon-Parilly
- 2010: 1,900m, Bordeaux le Bouscat
- 2011: 2,000m, Lyon-Parilly
- 2012: 2,000m, Marseille-Borély
- 2013: 1,900m, Bordeaux le Bouscat
- 2014: 2,000m, Lyon-Parilly
- 2015: 2,000m, Angers
- 2016: 2,000m, Lyon-Parilly
- 2017: 1,900m, Bordeaux le Bouscat
- 2018: 2,000m, Marseille-Borély

== See also ==
- List of French flat horse races
- Recurring sporting events established in 1982 – this race is included under its original title, Grand Prix des Provinces.
