= Gaspard Robert =

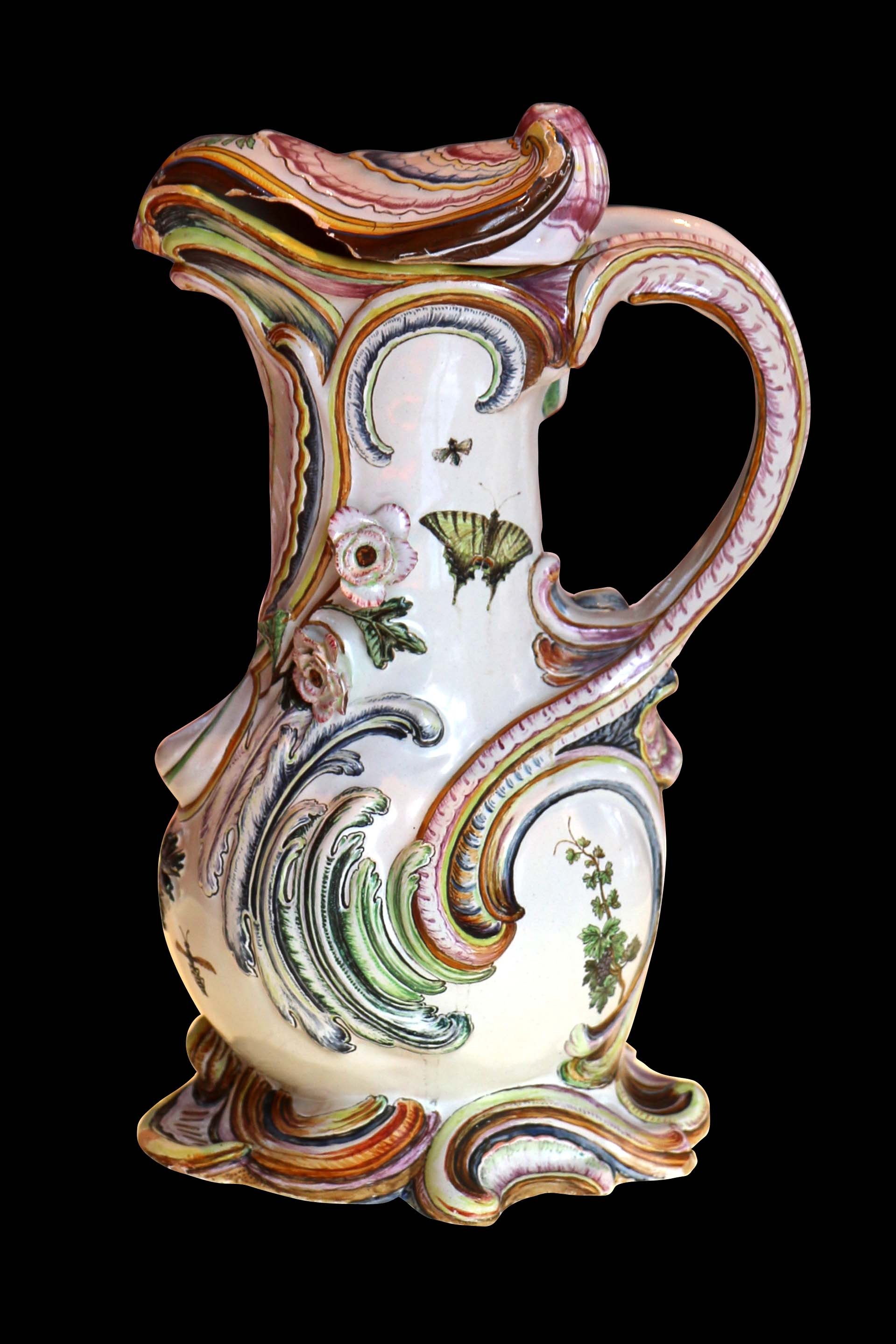
- Pitcher with lid, polychrome petit feu decoration. Around 1750
- Founded: 1750
- Founder: Gaspard Robertr
- Defunct: 1793
- Headquarters: Marseille, France
- Products: Faïence

Gaspard Robert (1722–1799) was the founder of a factory that made faience in Marseille, France, between 1750 and 1793. His products typically used monochrome or multicolored decorations of landscapes, animals, fish or flowers, and he also produced porcelain after 1773.

== History ==
Joseph Gaspard Robert first worked in a porcelain factory, and then returned to Marseille in 1750.

Robert operated a factory from about 1750 to 1793. He collaborated with André Estieu, whom his mother had married after being widowed. He took over from 1761, and led the pottery into a prodigious expansion. Married to Marguerite Defléchis, he did not have children and devoted himself entirely to his profession. Receiving numerous disciples, he was constantly expanding. In 1773 he teamed up with John Jacob Dortu from Berlin for the production of porcelain. This production was mainly a range of small objects for use for snacks between meals or for parts of a service.

In 1777 Joseph Gaspard Robert was visited by the Count of Provence, later Louis XVIII, who found that he was busily engaged in manufacturing porcelain. His work included large vases decorated with relief work and bouquets of flowers. Entire sets of tableware were being ordered for shipment abroad. His factory exported to Northern Europe and England, where his links with Freemasonry opened opportunities for him. In 1789, he was elected deputy to represent the potters. Faced with the economic crisis of the time, he was forced to cease operations in 1794.

== Products ==
Robert imitated the high-relief decorative style of la Veuve Perrin. He also produced plates with finely painted landscapes in their center, and after 1773 also made porcelain. He used a less formal style derived from the Rouen manufactory, the style rayonnant. The Robert pottery products typically use monochrome sepia, green, pink or blue decorations, or multicolored landscapes, animals, fish or flowers.

== Gallery ==
The Musée de la Faïence de Marseille has an important collection of work by Gaspard Robert.

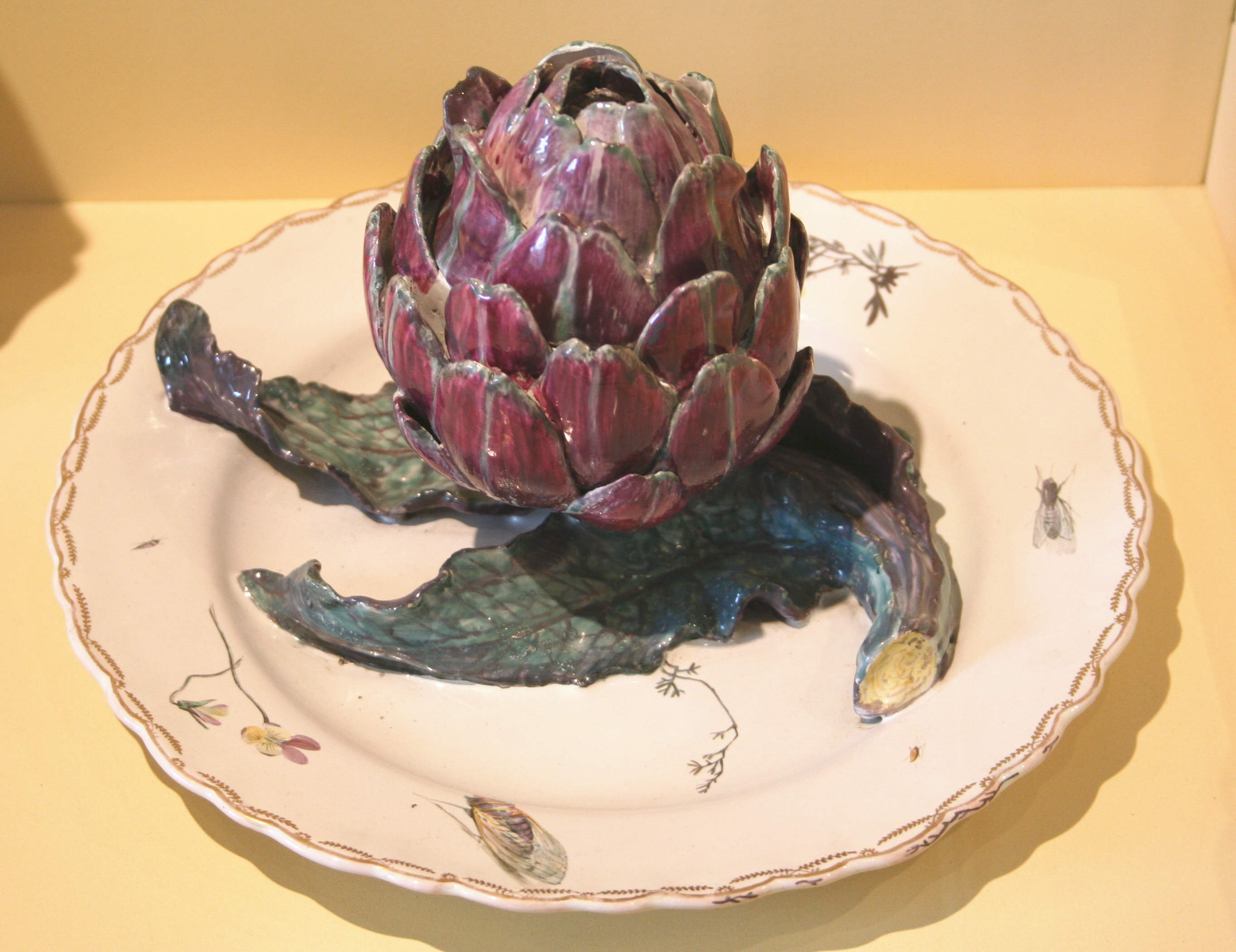
Sauce boat

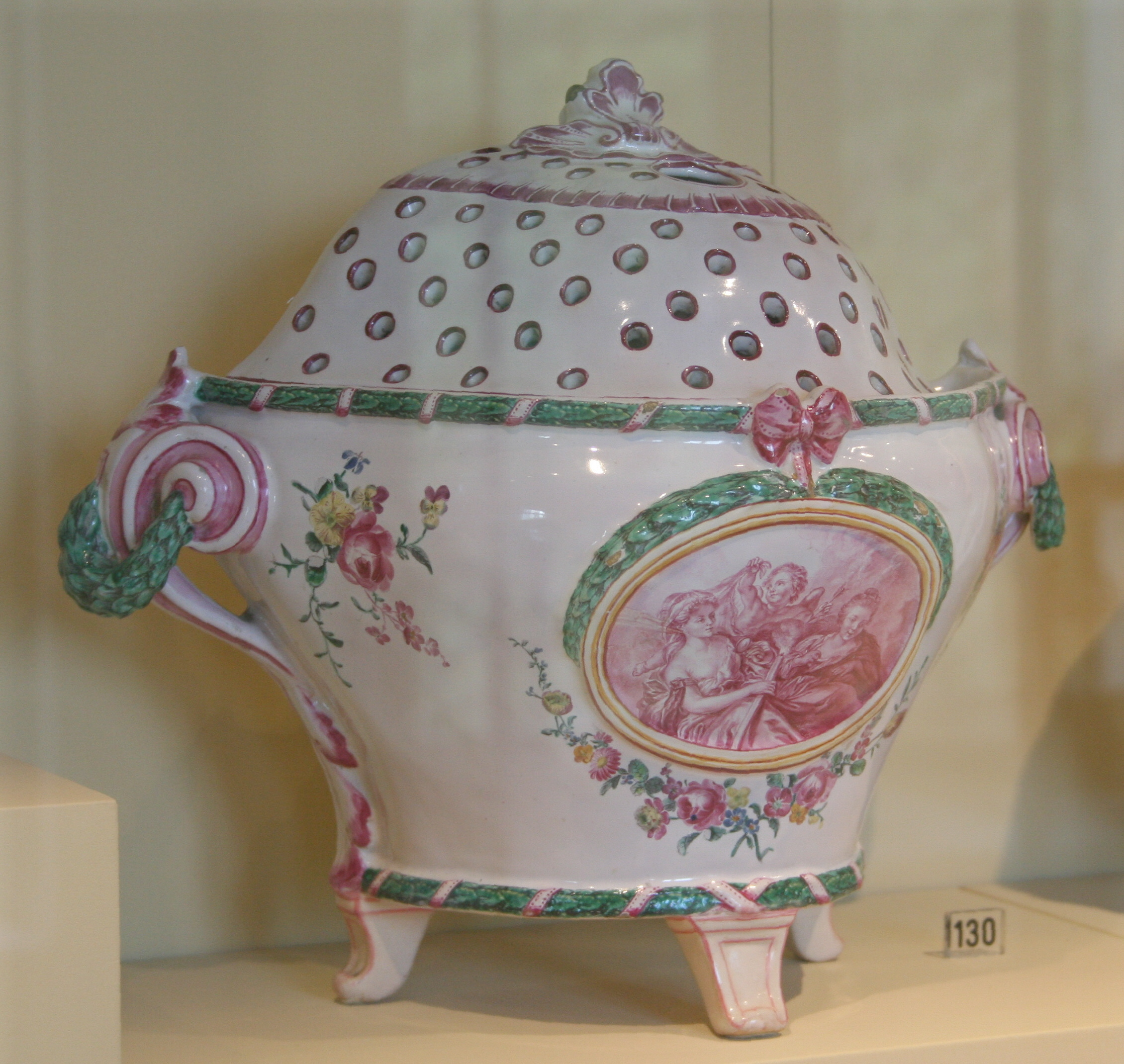
Pot pourri

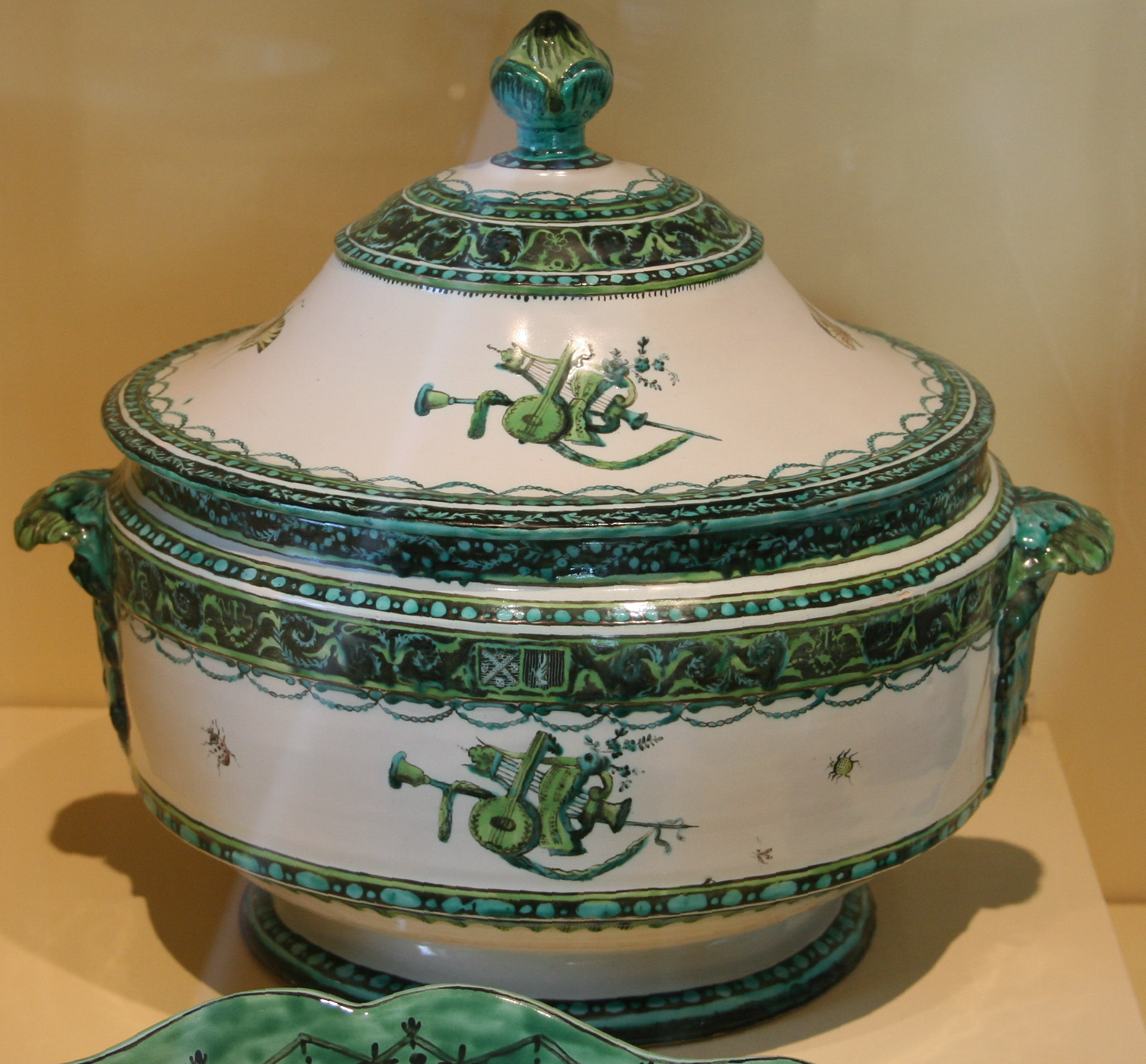
Tureen

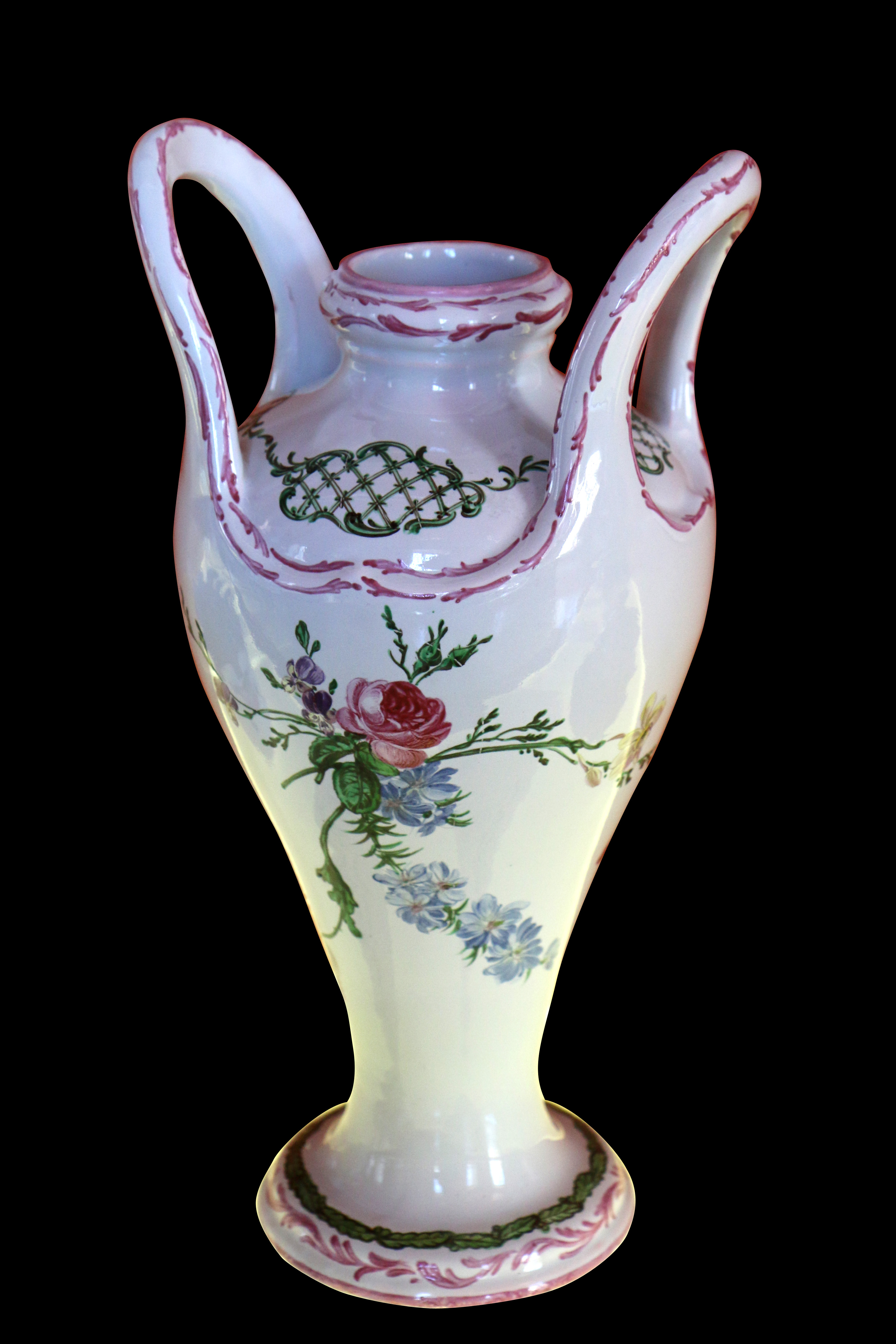
Baluster vase with handles

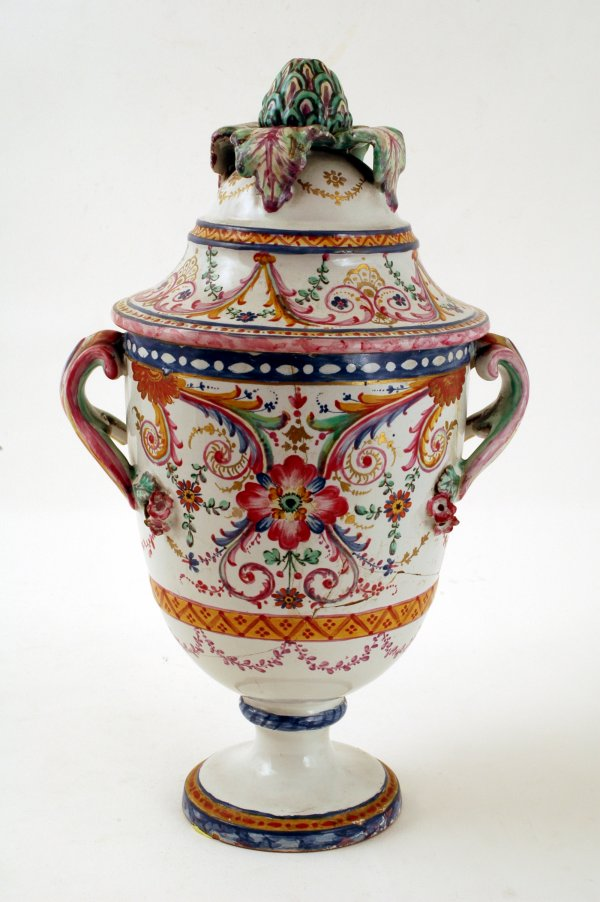
Vase, decor in the taste of Salembier, musée des Arts décoratifs et du Design, Bordeaux, France
