= Museum of the Decorative Arts, Fashion and Ceramics =

Musée des Arts décoratifs, de la Faïence et de la Mode
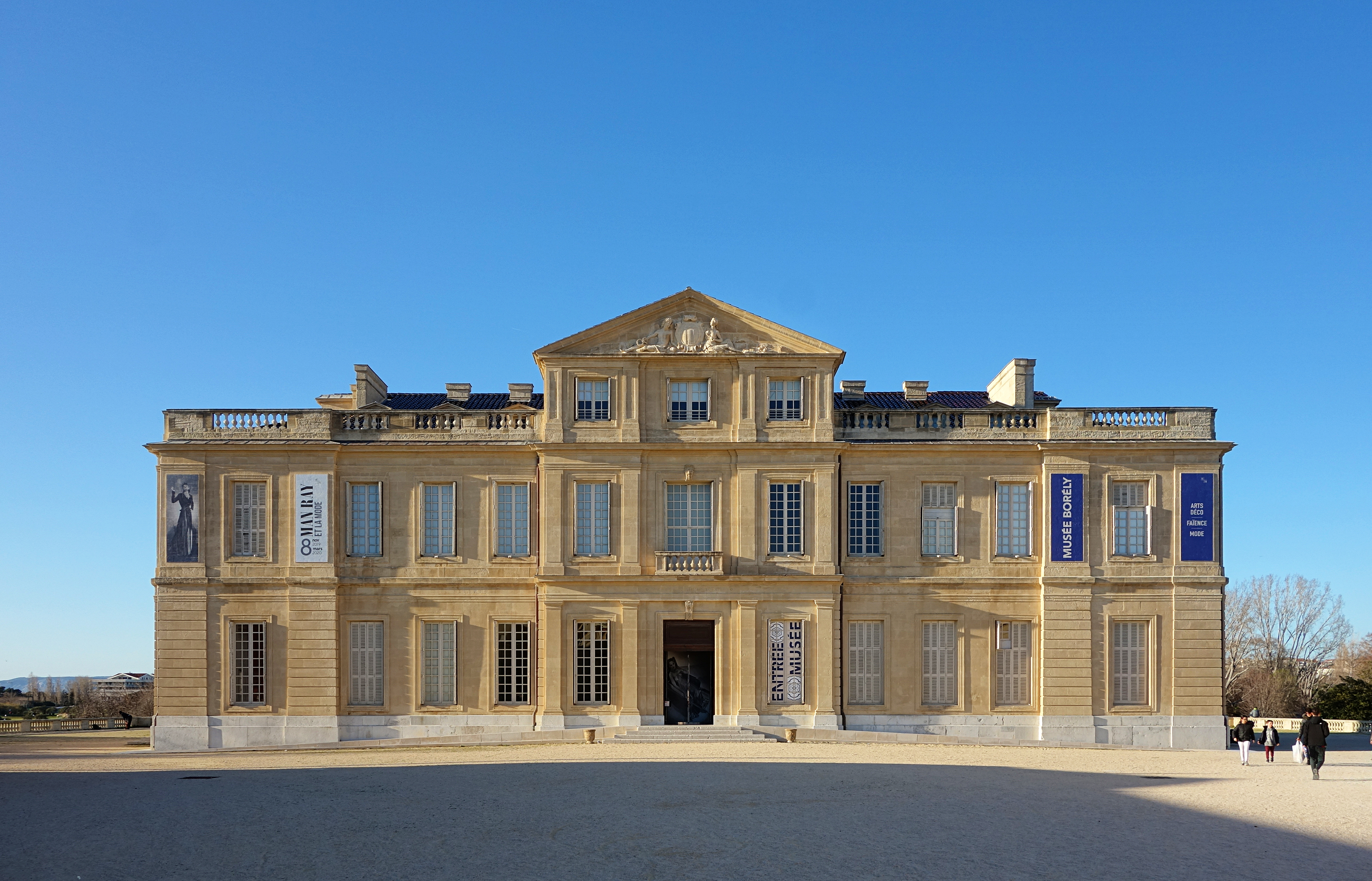
- Château Borély
- Location: 8th arrondissement of Marseille, France
- Coordinates: 43°16′N 5°23′E
- Visitors: 47,040 (2013), 40,608 (2015), 41,397 (2014), 42,568 (2017), 28,762 (2016), 32,532 (2018), 36,843 (2019)
- Website: musees.marseille.fr/chateau-borely-musee-des-arts-decoratifs-de-la-faience-et-de-la-mode
- Location of Museum of the Decorative Arts, Fashion and Ceramics

The Museum of the Decorative Arts, Fashion and Ceramics (French: Musée des Arts décoratifs, de la Faïence et de la Mode; Occitan: Museu de las Arts Decorativas, de la Moda e de la Ceramica) is a French museum opened to the public on 15 June 2013, in Château Borély. It is located at 132, Avenue Clot-Bey, Marseille.

The museum contains the collections of the former Musée de la Faïence de Marseille (Faience Museum) at Château Pastré, Fashion Museum, the decorative arts collections of the Musée Cantini, Museum of Old Marseille, as well as furniture from Borély. It has a total of 200 items of furniture, 563 decorative art objects, 750 ceramic pieces, 5,600 fashion items, 1,600 accessories and 100 perfume bottles.
