= Musée de la Faïence de Marseille =

Pottery museum in Marseille, France

Musée de la Faïence
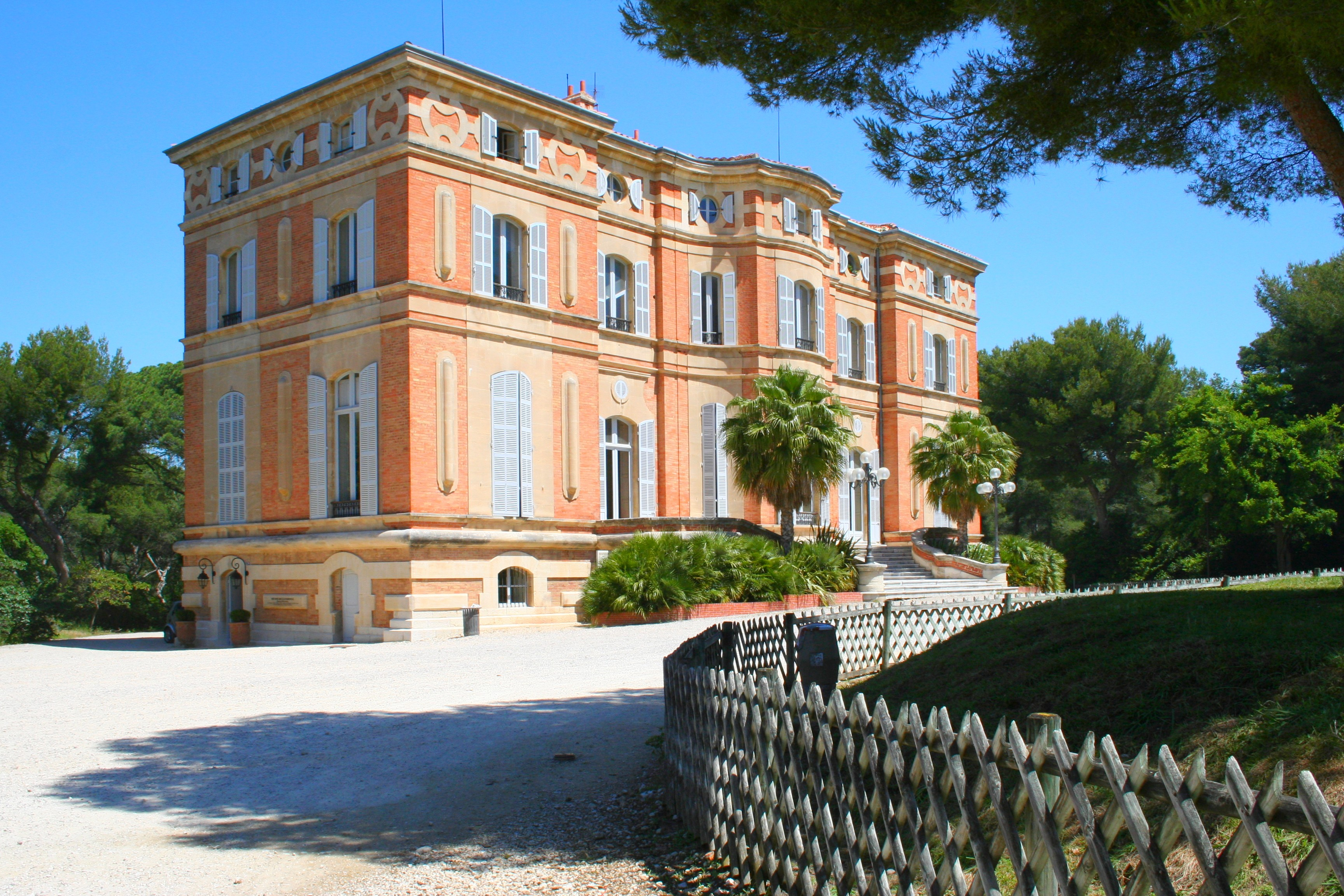

- Location within France
- Location: 8th arrondissement of Marseille, France
- Coordinates: 43.233528°N 5.373444°E
- Type: Pottery from Marseille
- Collection size: 1500 pieces

The Musée de la Faïence de Marseille (Occitan: Museu de la Faïença de Marselha) was a museum in southern Marseille, France, dedicated to faience, a type of pottery. It opened to the public in June 1995, in Château Pastré at 157, Avenue de Montredon 13008 Marseille. It closed on 31 December 2012, to allow for the transfer of its collections to the new faience museum at Château Borély, the Museum of the Decorative Arts, Fashion and Ceramics, as part of preparations for Marseille becoming the European Capital of Culture in 2013.

The museum was housed in the 19th century, building named after its former owner Eugène Pastré (1806–1868). The château is at the end of a long avenue in the 120 hectares (300 acres) Campagne Pastré park, owned by the city of Marseille.

== Château ==
Eugène Pastré and his wife Céline de Beaulincourt-Marles wanted to build a house suitable for the celebrations and social gatherings they gave. Around 1860, they assigned construction of the building to the Parisian architect Jean-Charles Danjoy (1806–1862), who had undertaken a first plan at the request of the city of Marseille for the Palais Longchamp, which was not accepted. The country house is polychrome, with pink bricks and white stones, with curves and counter-curves.

The layout of the castle allows it to exhibit nearly 1,500 pieces of ceramic pottery. All exhibits on the ground floor, however, were removed a few years ago. The cases have since remained completely empty.

== Faience of Marseille ==
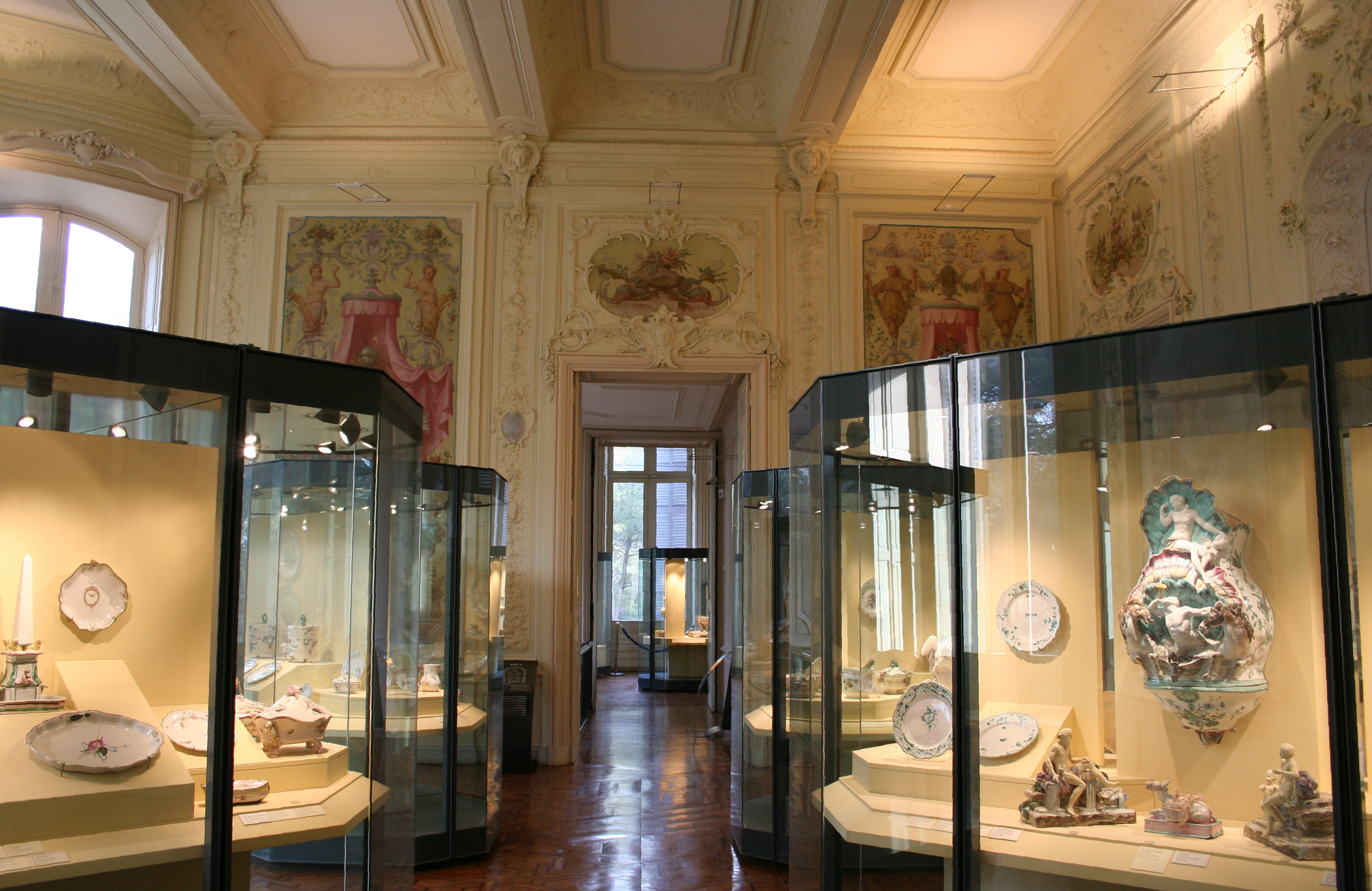
Interior of the museum

There are records of pottery being made in Marseille from the sixteenth century. In 1526 Claude Forbin, lord of Gardanne, started a faïence works with an Italian, Jean Angeli from Offida. They established the pottery in one of the suburbs of Marseille, at Saint-Marcel, and engaged a Spaniard named Sanchez from Lérida to run the operation. In the 1520s, the skilled worker Bruno Catani, son of the Milanese Antoine Catani who had trained him in Marseille, established himself in the suburb of Aubagne. He produced a wide variety of pottery products. Two other potters, Antoine Franc from Manosque and Laurent Borelli from Grimaud, rented space in his factory and use of the oven on condition that they did not make competing products. In 1535, Jean Angeli had joined them. Nothing is known of the details of their production.

A potter named Antoine Cléricy is named as making fine glasswork and pottery in 1641 at the chateau of Fontainbleau. He seems to have been the ancestor of the Clerissy dynasty of potters in Marseilles.

After this first production of little importance, the resurgence of the art of pottery in Marseille is the work of an influential and wealthy personage, Joseph Fabre (1634–1717) former consul, financier, owner of a silk factory and banker of the Duke of Savoy. In 1675, he brought Joseph Clérissy from Moustiers-Sainte-Marie (Alpes-de-Haute-Provence) and installed him in his property of Saint-Jean du Désert, launching the manufacture of faïence in Marseille. This industry grew from the end of the seventeenth century and reached its full development in the second half of the eighteenth century between 1750, and the French Revolution. The increase in demand was due to population growth and the rise of a middle class looking for luxuries. Refinement of the domestic environment and adoption of more formal dining manners stimulated development of high-quality products.

By 1787, on the eve of the revolution, there were nine manufacturers of enameled faience: Agenl and Sauze, Antoine Bonnefoy, Boyer, Fauchier, Fesquet, Ferrin and Abellard, Joseph-Gaspard Robert. Honoré Savy and Jean-Baptiste Viry.

== Exhibitors ==
The collection is based on acquisitions by the City of Marseille as well as a number of valuable gifts, providing a representative set of faïence from Marseille as well as some pieces from other locations. A famous collection of faïence from Pierre and Lison Jourdan-Barry was given to the city in April 1995, and in 1998, an exceptional set of eighteenth century work of Moustiers was added. The museum now has one of the finest collections of faïence in Europe. In addition, the museum has a fine collection of contemporary glass and of ceramics from 1950 to the present.

The Faience makers from Marseille whose works are exhibited in this museum include Joseph Clérissy, Madeleine Héraud, Louis Leroy, Joseph Fauchier, Veuve Perrin, Honoré Savy, Gaspard Robert and Honoré Bonnefoy.

=== Ateliers Clérissy ===
Joseph Clérissy founded the first faience factory in the Marseilles region around 1677, in Saint-Jean-du-Désert. His family managed the factory until 1733. At first it produced Baroque-style wares decorated mostly in blue with manganese outlines. Some designs were based on those of Simon Vouet (1589–1649), and Nicolas Poussin (1594–1665). Others included picturesque scenes and chinoiseries. The products of this workshop are characterized by sober colors. The decorations are inspired by scenes of historical, mythological, religious or romantic character.

Faïences Joseph Clérissy

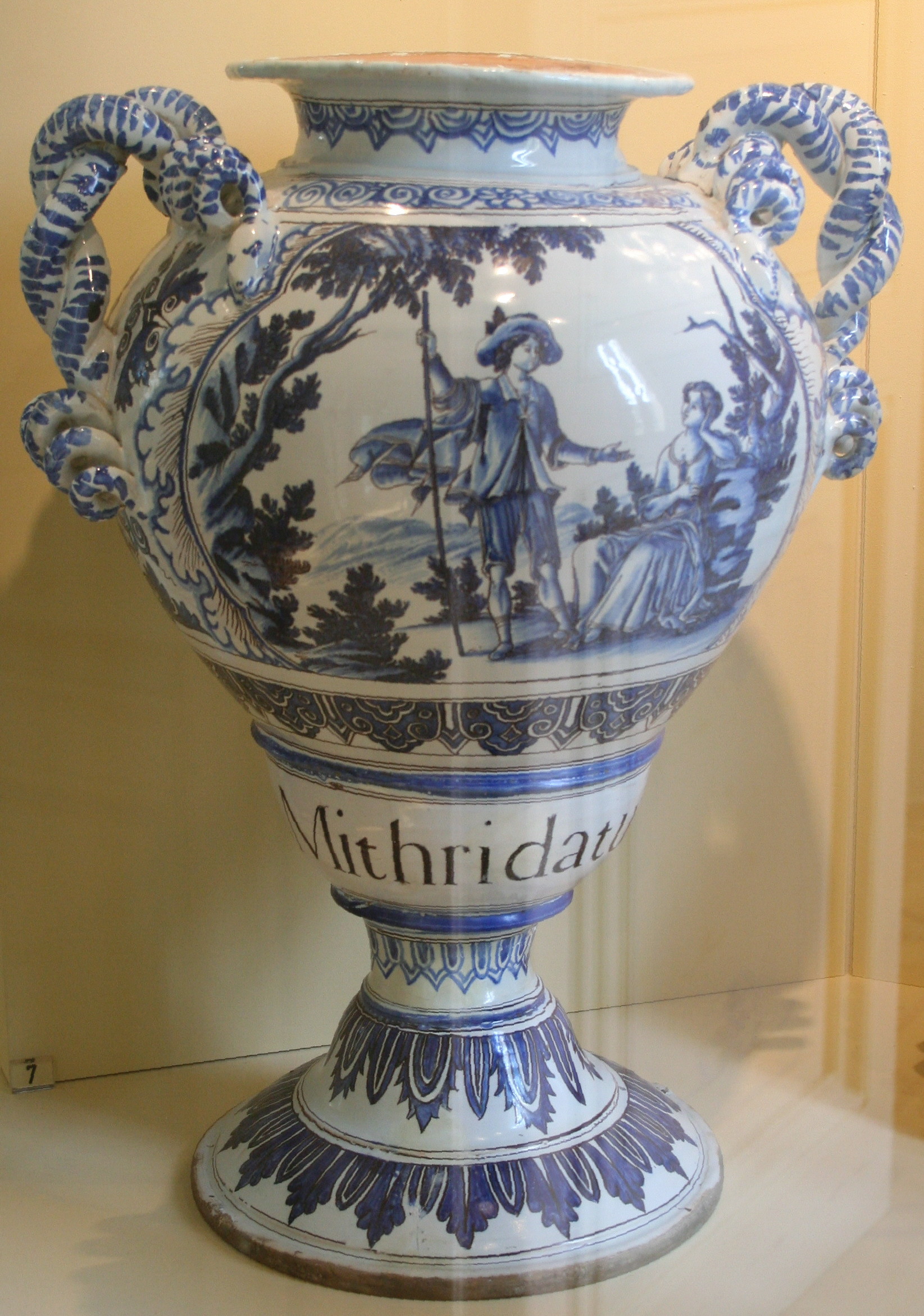
Pharmacy vase

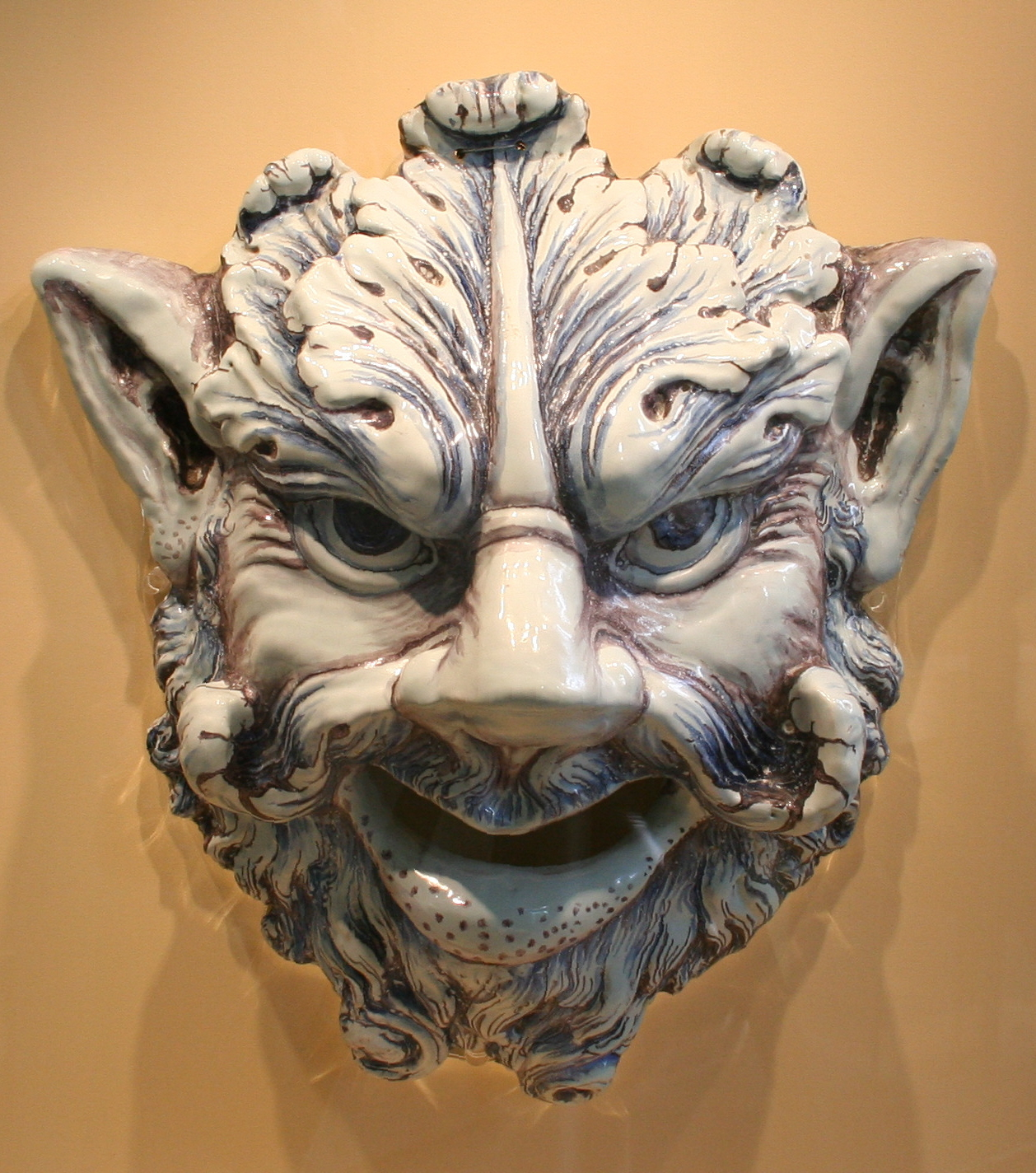
Mascaron

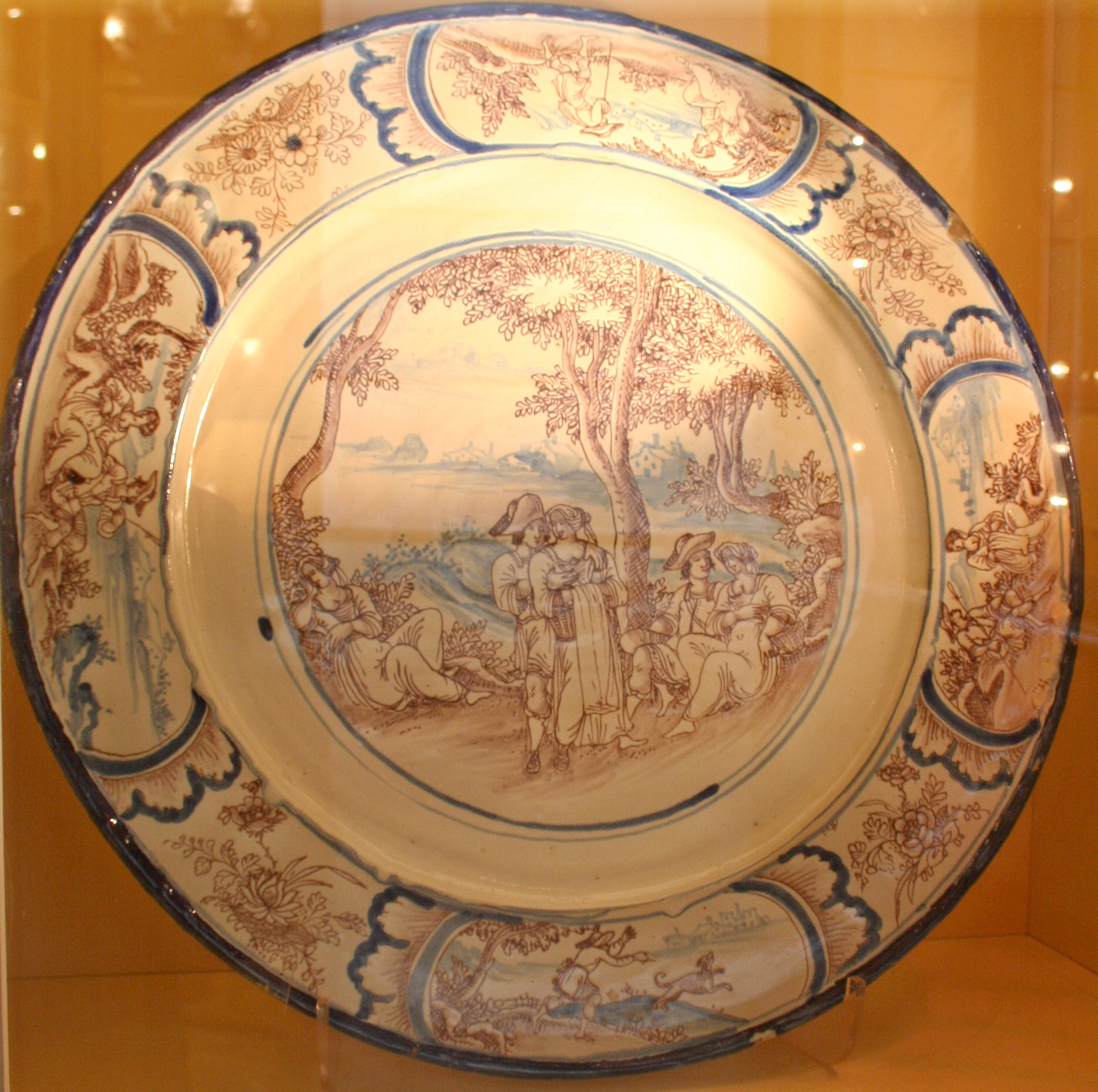
Round plate

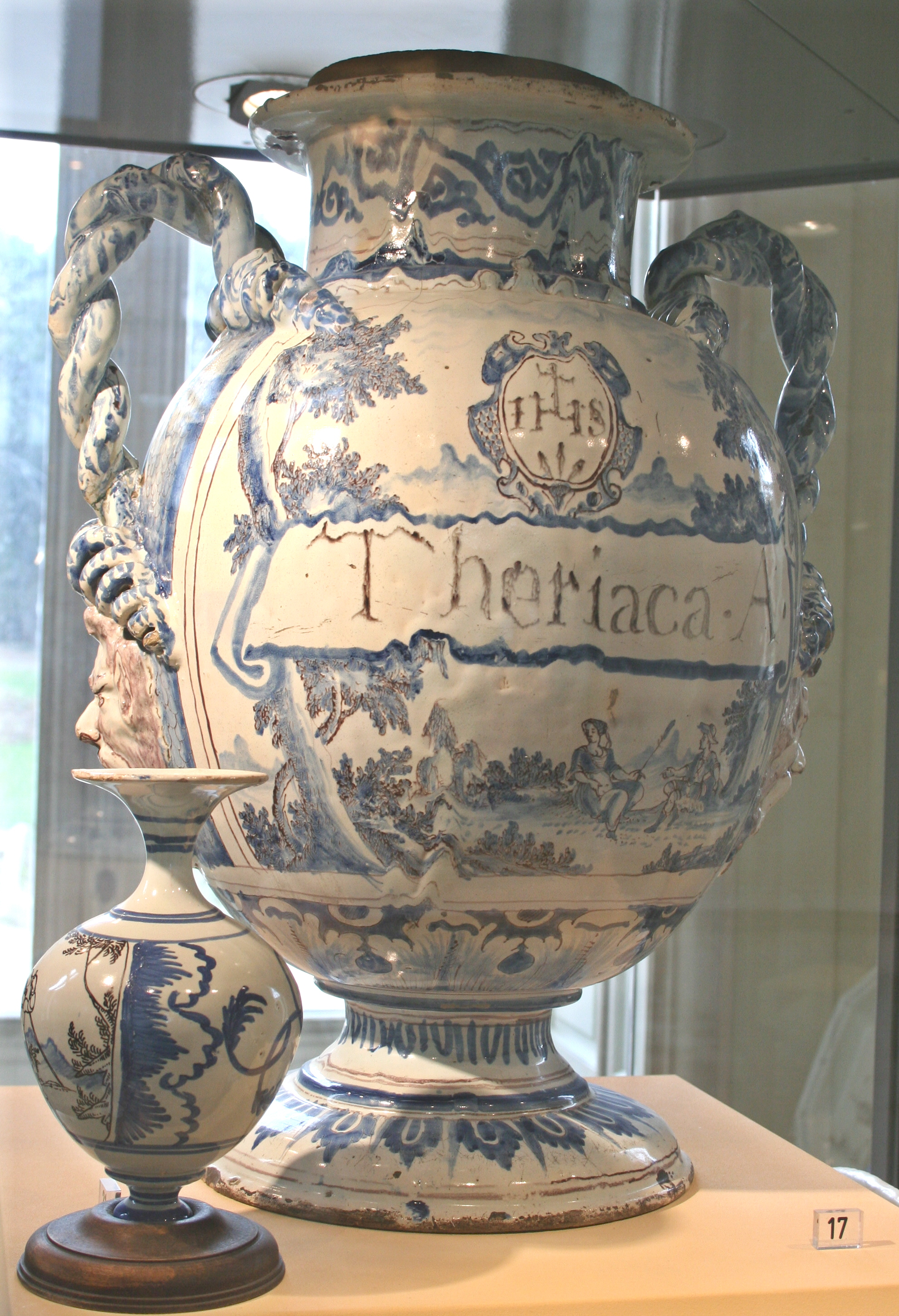
Pharmacy vase

=== Madeleine Héraud and Louis Leroy ===
Anne Clérissy (1664–1710), daughter of Antoine Clérissy, married Etienne Héraud. She bequeathed a pottery near the Porte d'Aix to his daughter Madeleine Heraud (1685–1749), who was married to Louis Leroy, on condition that she used Joseph Fauchier to continue with the operation. In 1727, the factory was expropriated during the opening of the Rue d'Aix and the creation of the Place Pentagon, now the Place Marceau. A new pottery was established at the rue de la Calade. At first it was headed by Madeleine Héraud, then by her son Louis Leroy (1704–1778), named after his father. On the death of his mother in 1749, Louis Leroy created a new factory near the Porte Paradis. His son Antoine Leroy took over in 1780, but died only two years after his father.

This production mainly by grand feu was characterized at the start by influences from Rouen, with symmetrical compositions using blue and red. After 1750, Oriental or grotesque styles were used.

=== Joseph Fauchier ===
Fauchier Joseph (1687–1751) was born in Peyruis in the Alpes-de-Haute-Provence.

Joseph Fauchier (d. 1751) who learned his trade in Clerissy's factory set up his own works in Marseille in 1710. His family controlled this factory until 1789. Fauchier started to make statues, and specialized in faience decorated with flowers in natural arrangements. At the beginning of the production the work used decorations "à la Berain." Rouen-style pieces were also produced. Subsequently, garlands or wreaths of foliage surrounding landscapes were used. The factory produced polychrome landscape of the "Moustiers" style and parts in the "Chinese" style.

Faïences Fauchier

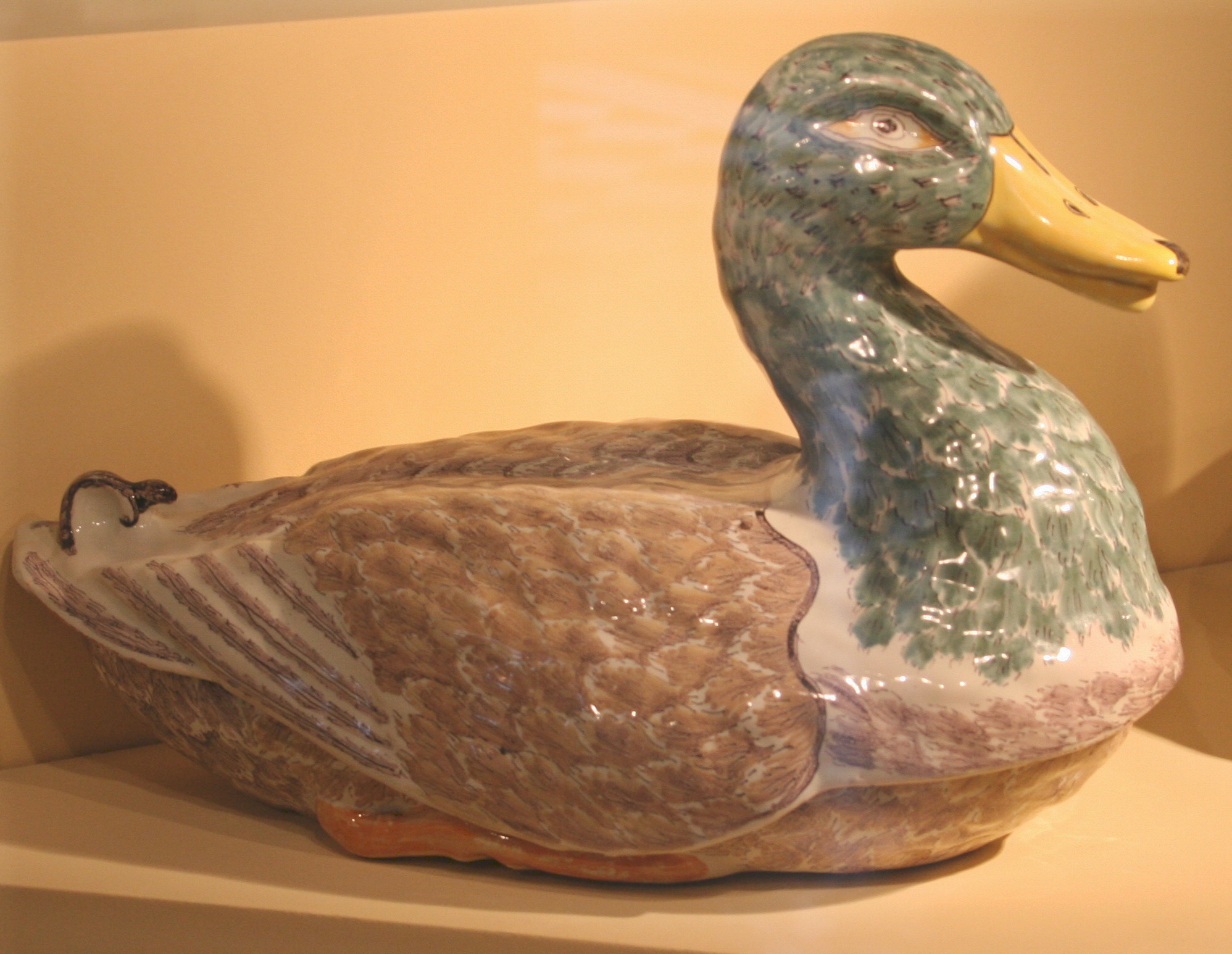
Terrine in the form of a duck

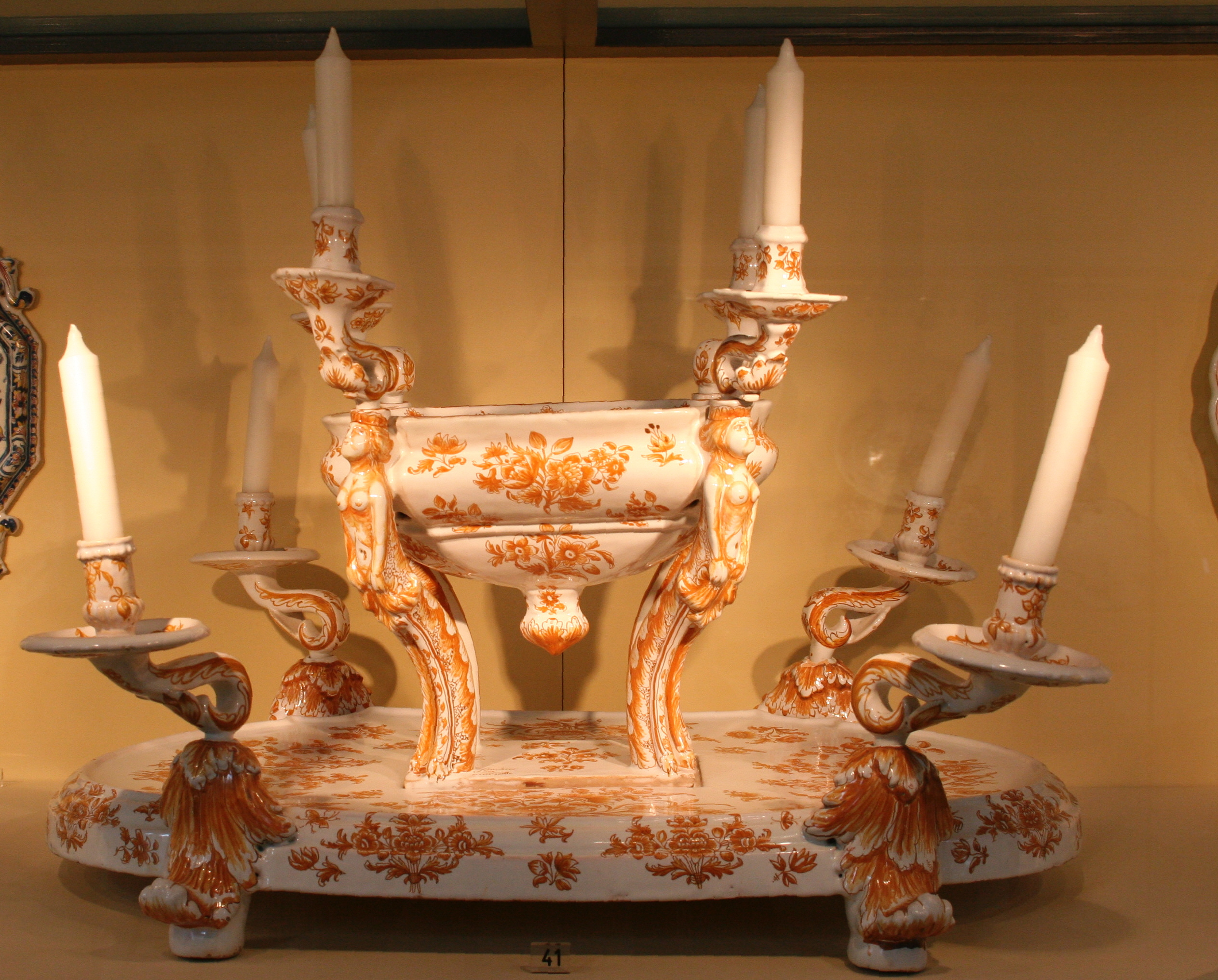
Surtout de table

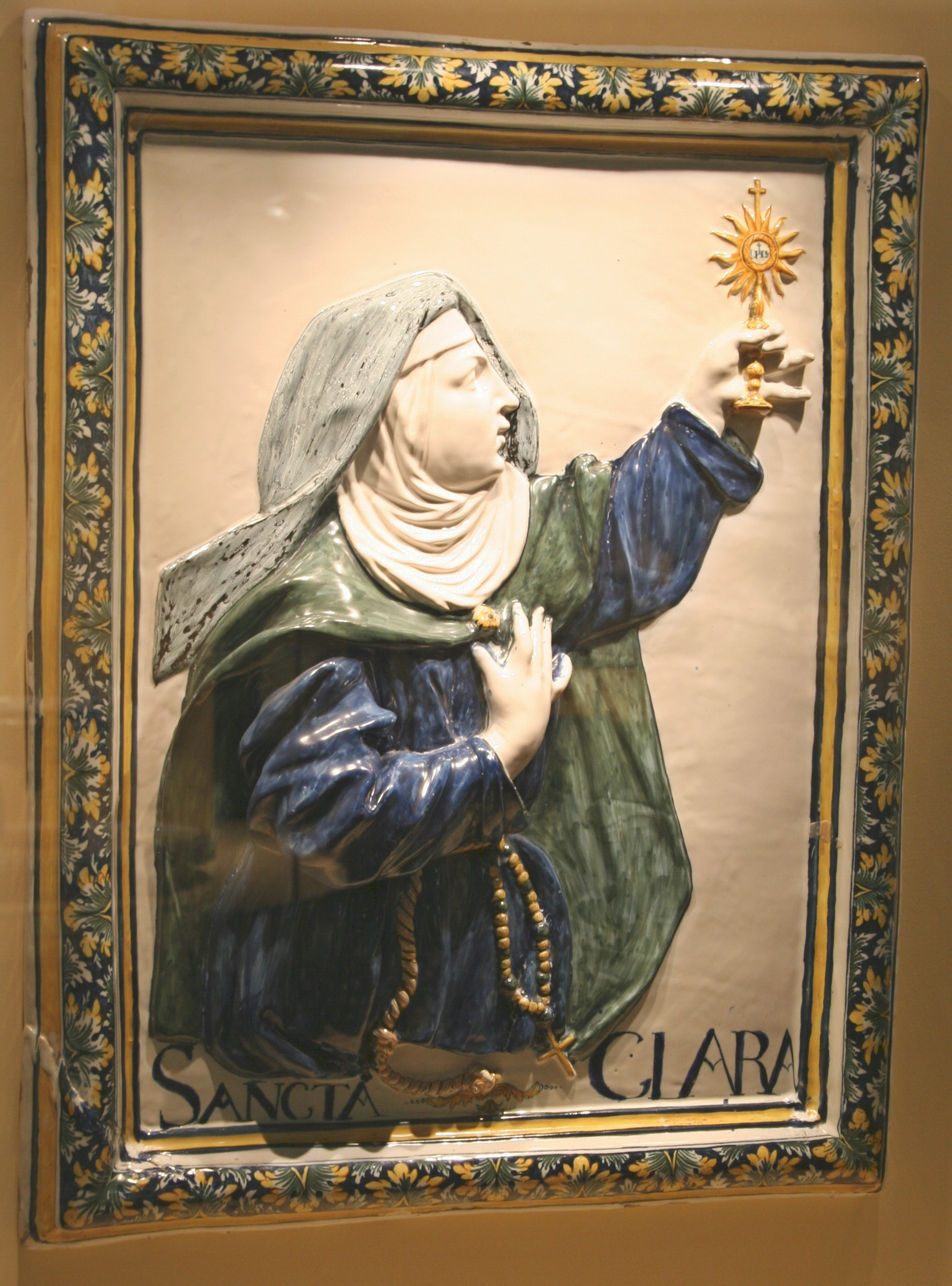
Sainte Claire

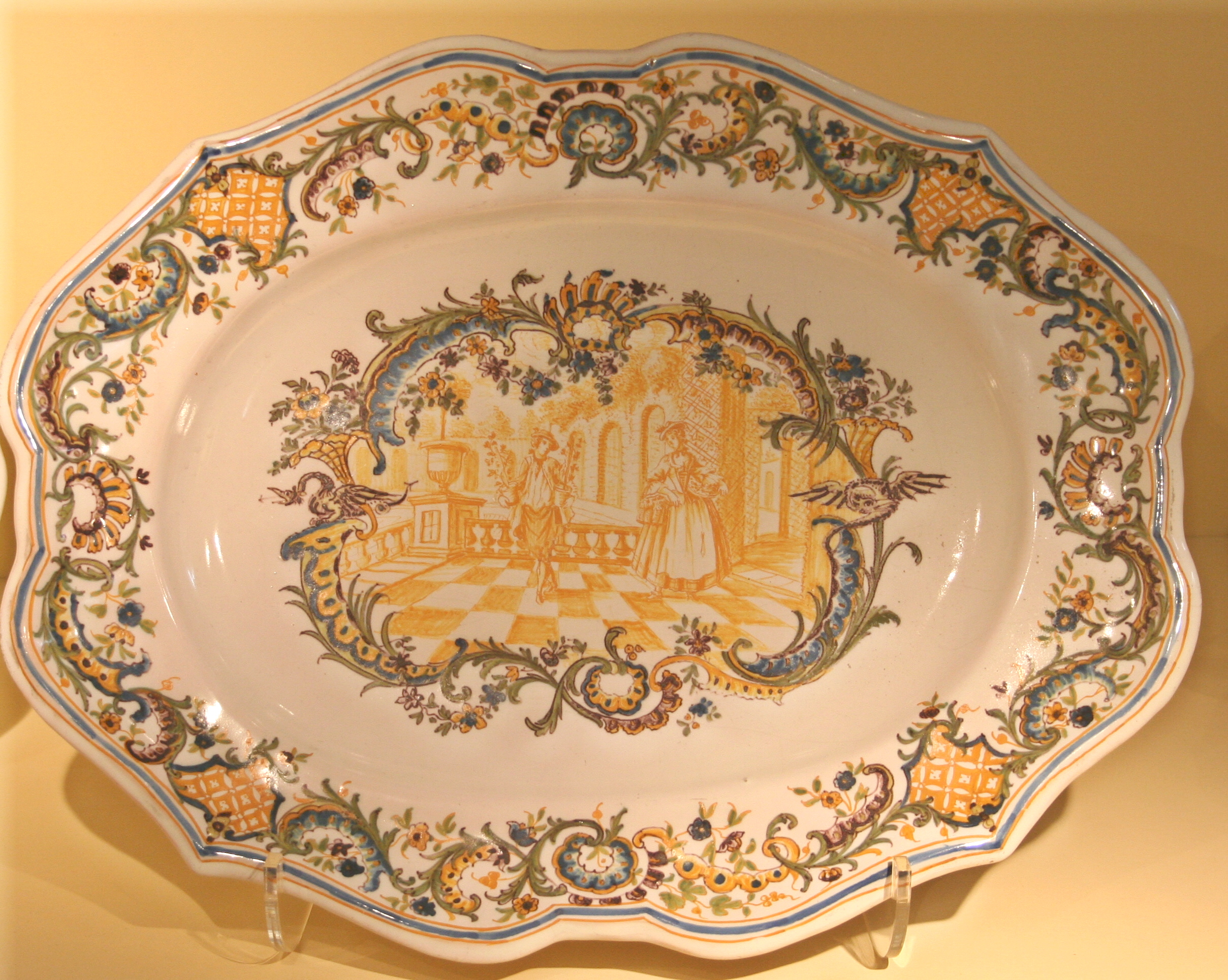
Oblong plate

=== Veuve Perrin ===
Claude Perrin, born in Nevers on 20 April 1696, settled in Marseille in 1733, where he died on 25 March 1748. Pierette Candelot, his widow, took over the factory after her husband's death. It became known as Veuve Perrin (Widow Perrin). She entered into a partnership agreement with Honoré Savy, a member of the Academy of Painting and Sculpture in Marseille. This cooperation lasted from 1760 to 1770. Pierette Candelot ran the factory until her death in 1794. Her son Joseph and granddaughter Anne continued to operate it until 1803.

The factory used the petit feu technique of decorating, which let it obtain through successive firings a variety of colors rivaling those of porcelain. This factory became well known for its naturalistic polychrome decorations of flowers and insects. Around 1764, the factory introduced a turquoise enamel. Some of the wares were decorated with fish and shells, seaside scenes and views of the port of Marseille. Production was characterized by a wide variety of shapes and designs, often extravagant in molding and decoration.

Faïences Veuve Perrin

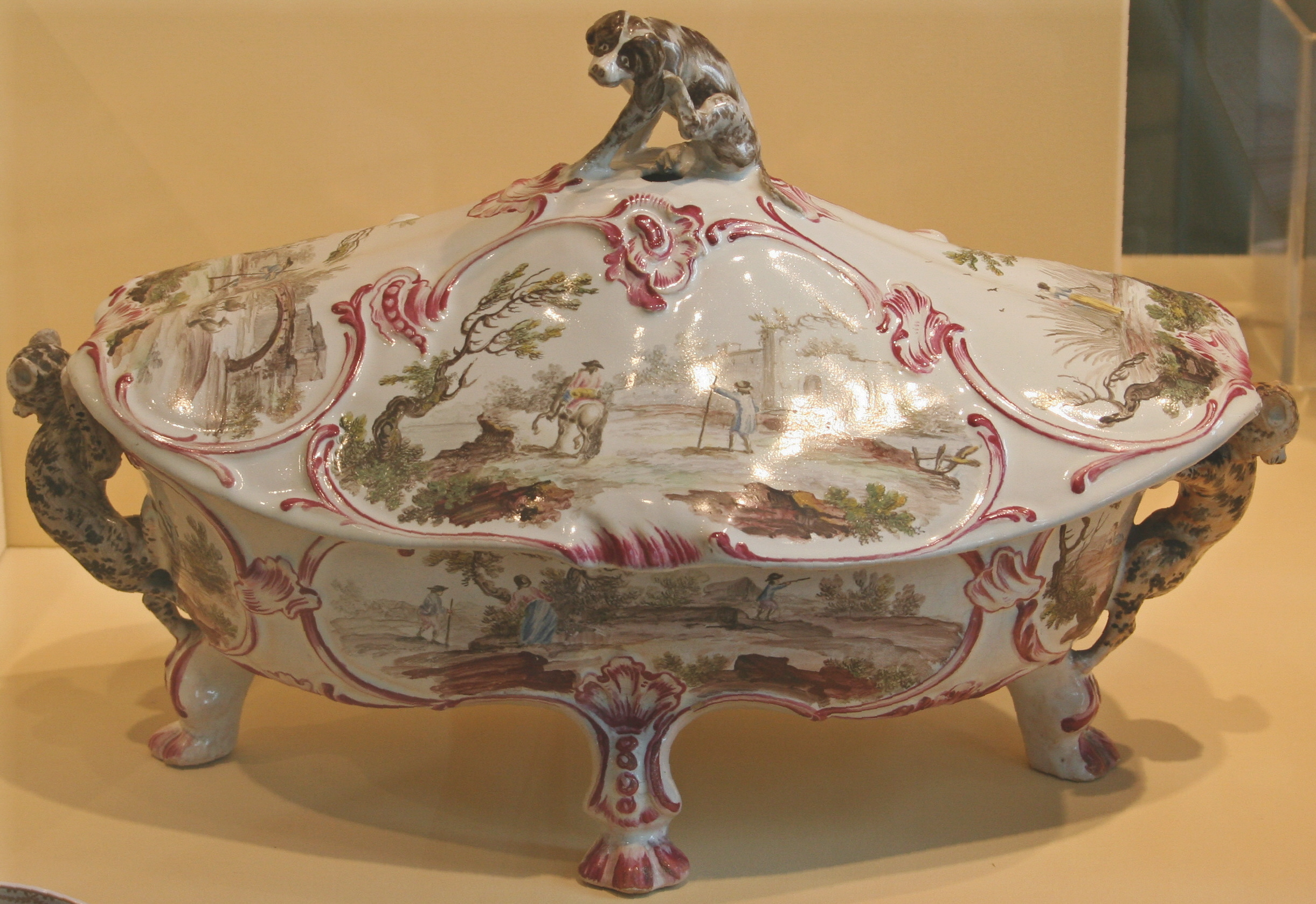
Bowl with dog scratching his ear

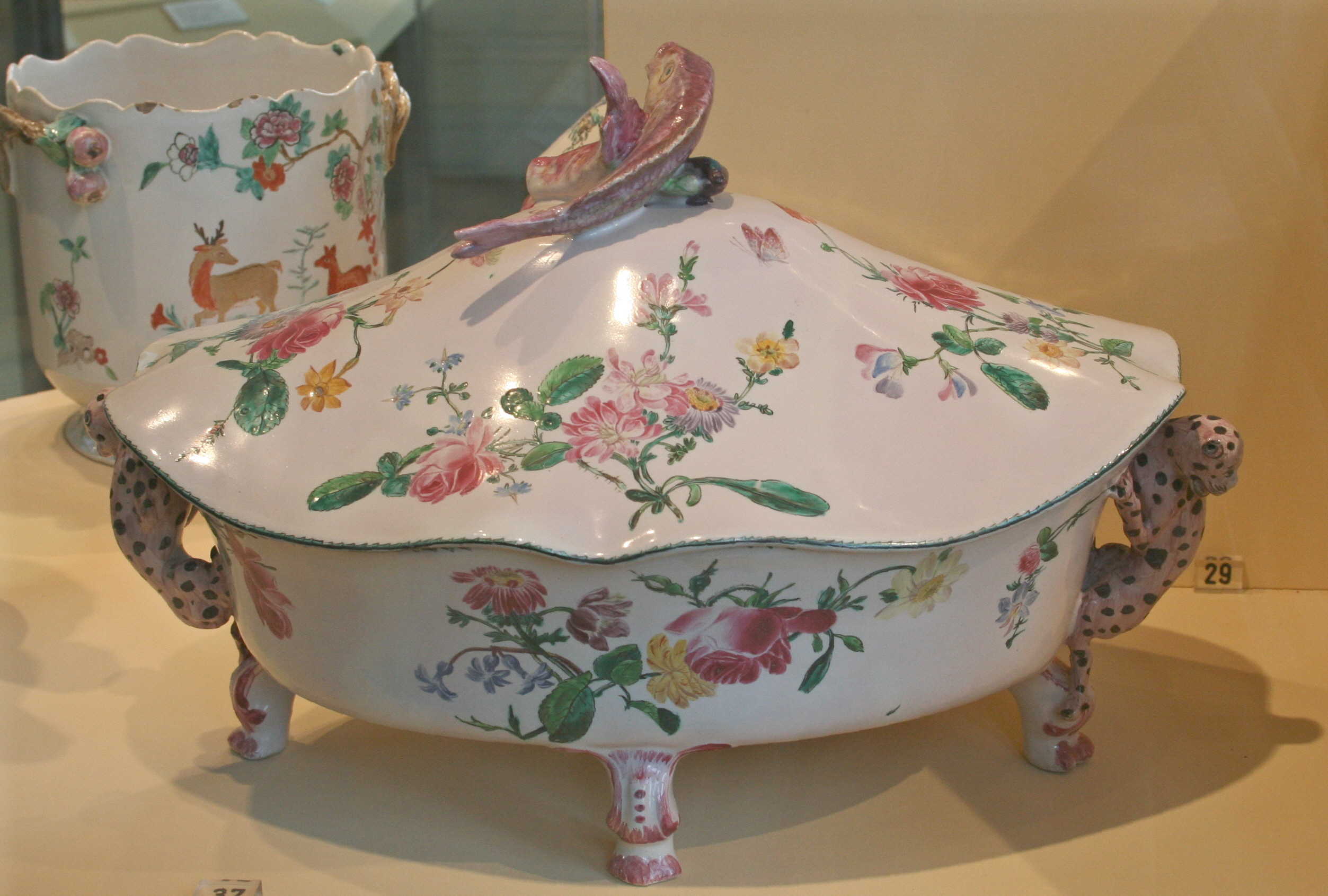
Oblong bowl

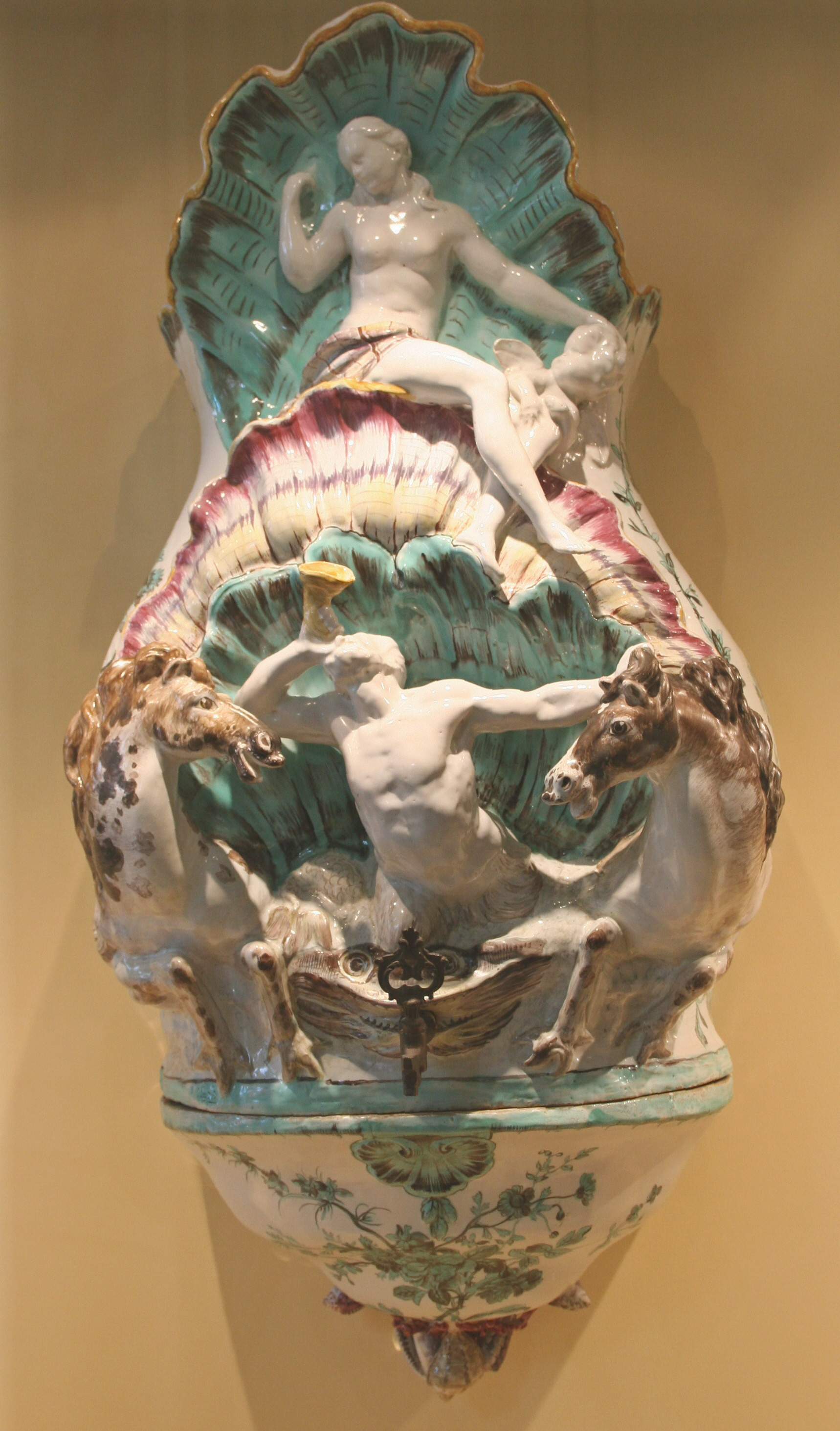
Applique fountain

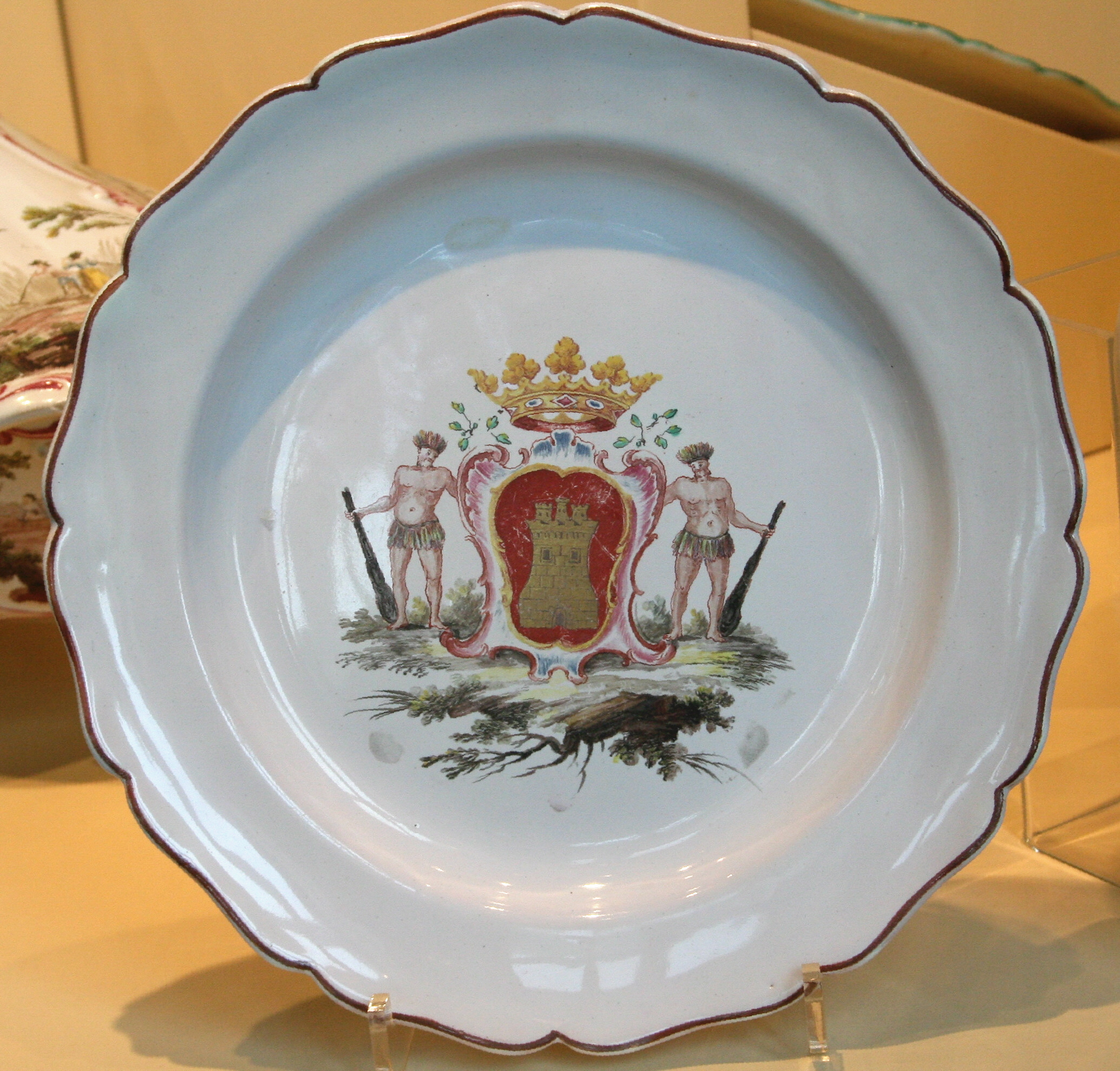
Plate

=== Honoré Savy ===
Honoré Savy (1725–1790) was associated with the Veuve Perrin and Leroy factories. Around 1749, a new period of faience manufacture began in which the first factory was established by Honore Savy in which polychrome decoration succeeded the earlier style using blue with some violet. In 1765, Honoré Savy became a member of the Royal Academy of Painting and Sculpture of Marseilles. In July 1777, Savy was visited by Monsieur, the king's brother, later Louis XVIII, who gave permission for the factory to use his arms, and to display his statue in the gallery. A Marseille business directory for 1779–1780 listed him as making both enamelled faience and porcelain. He used classic themes of decoration: flowers, landscapes, seascapes and fish. He was the inventor of a green color, drawn from copper, used on pieces of monochrome green.

Faïences Honoré Savy

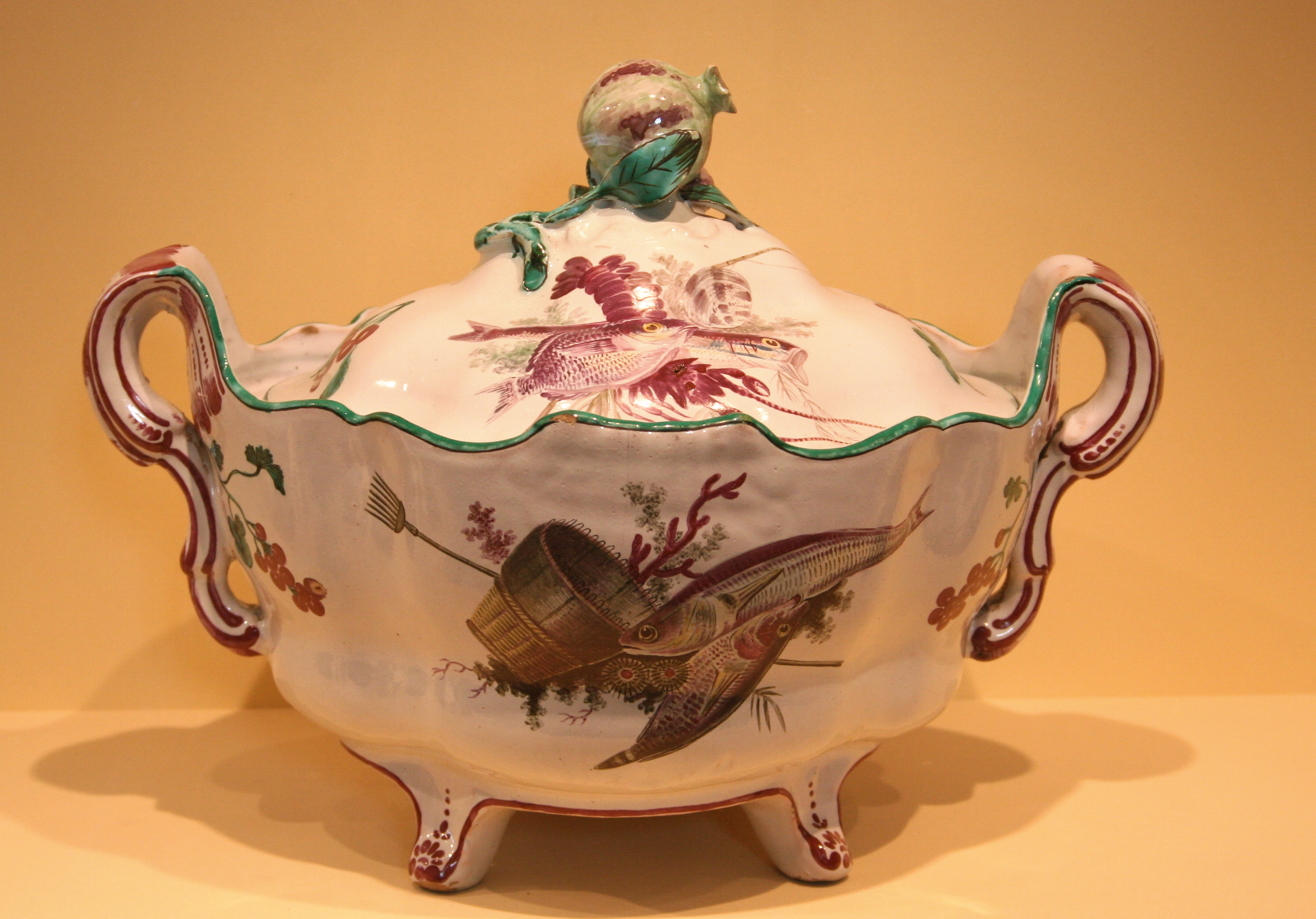
Tureen

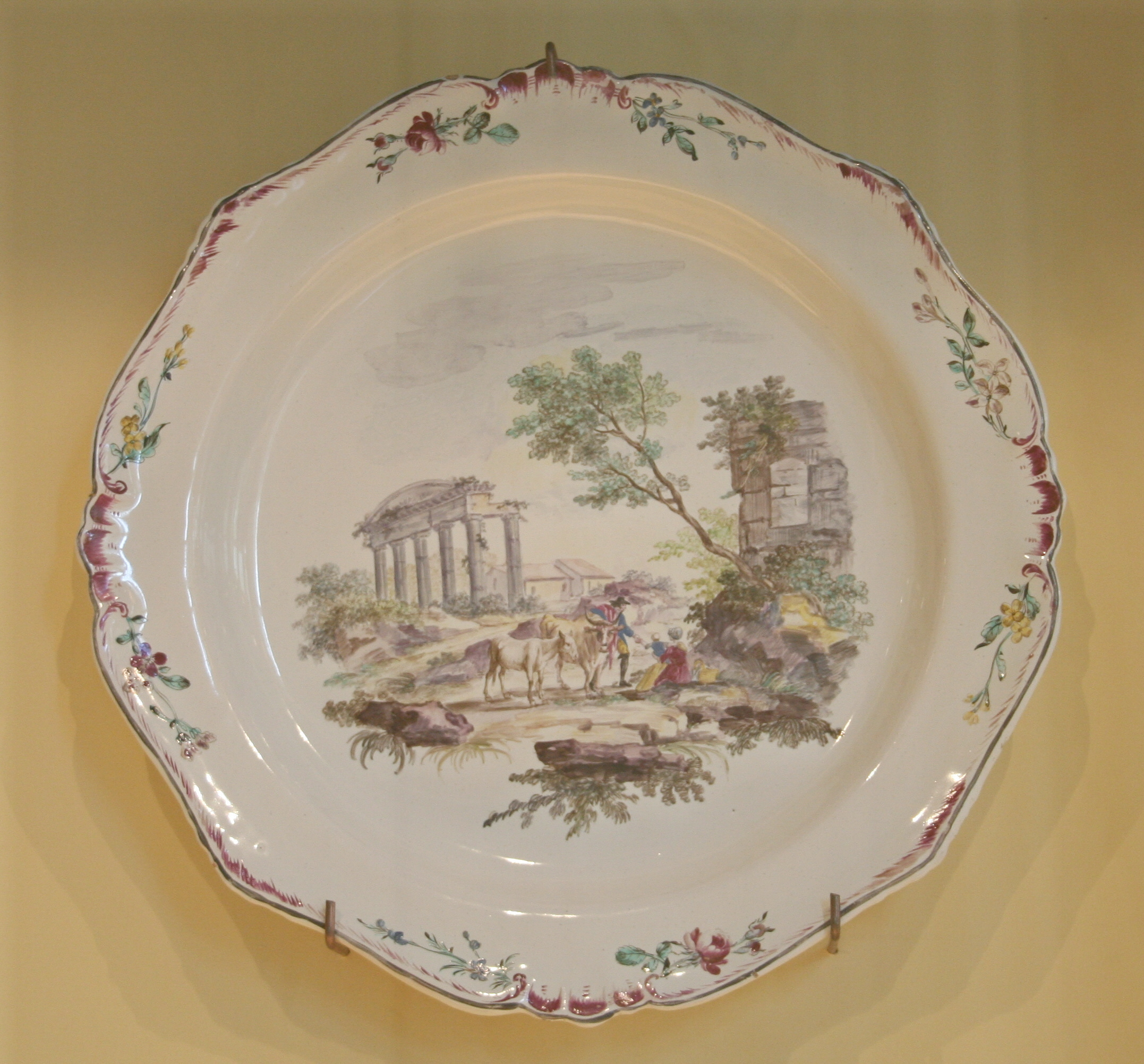
Circular plate

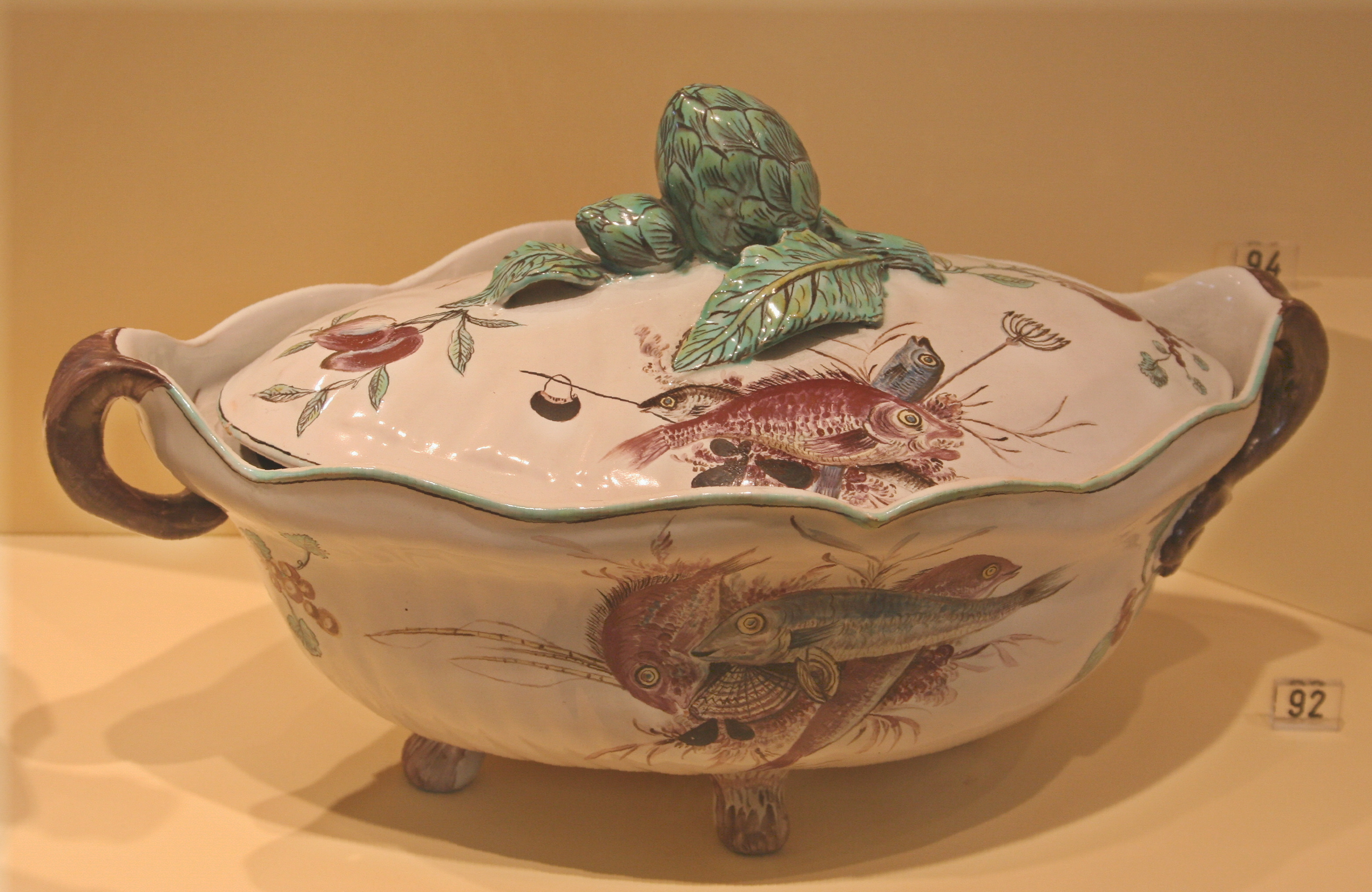
Oblong bowl

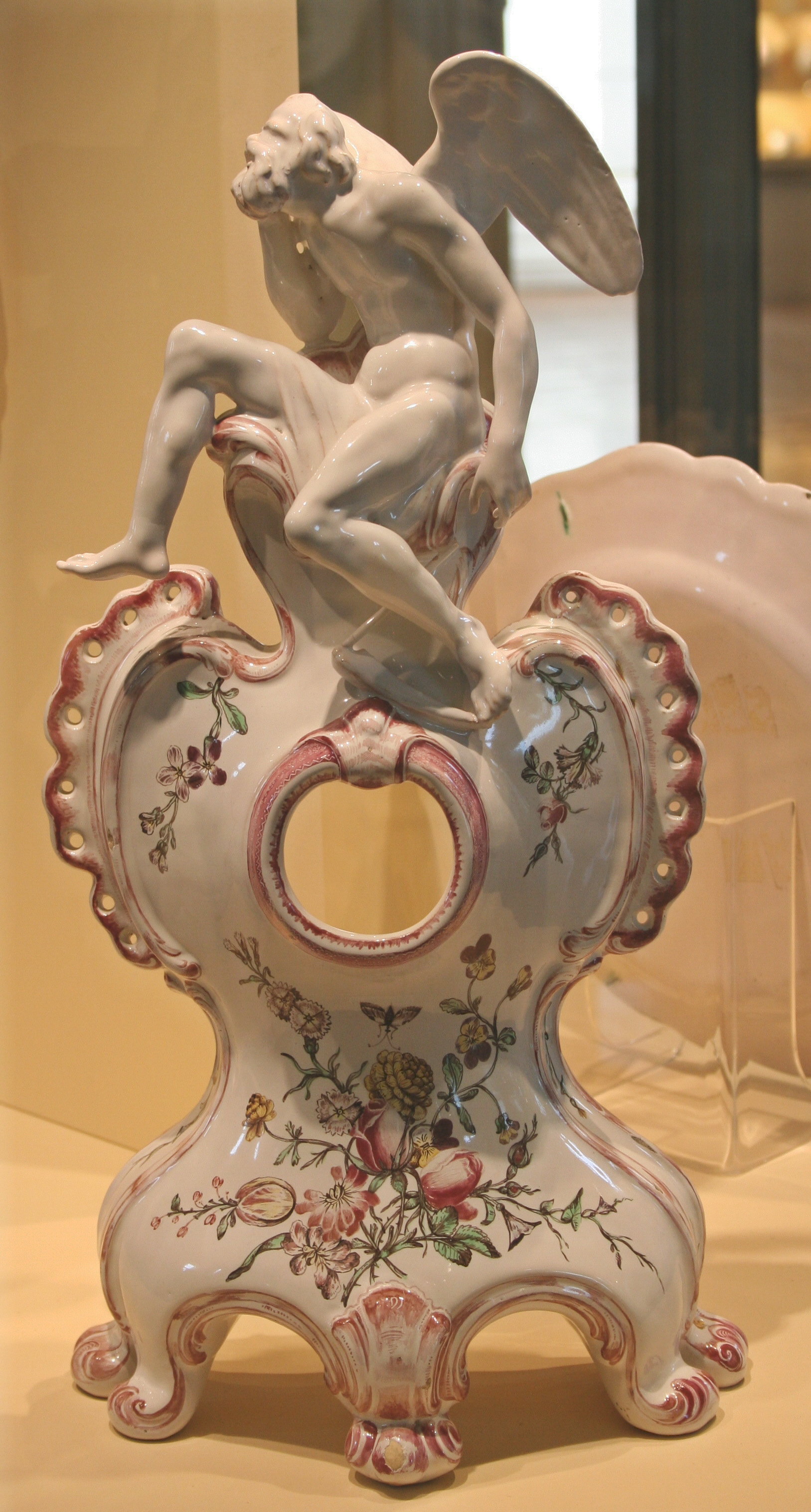
Porte montre

=== Gaspard Robert ===
Joseph Gaspard Robert operated a factory from about 1750 to 1793. His work included large vases decorated with relief work and bouquets of flowers. Entire sets of tableware were being ordered for shipment abroad. Robert imitated the high-relief decorative style of la Veuve Perrin. He also produced plates with finely painted landscapes in their center, and after 1773, also made porcelain. He used a less formal style derived from the Rouen factories, the style rayonnant.

Gaspard Robert

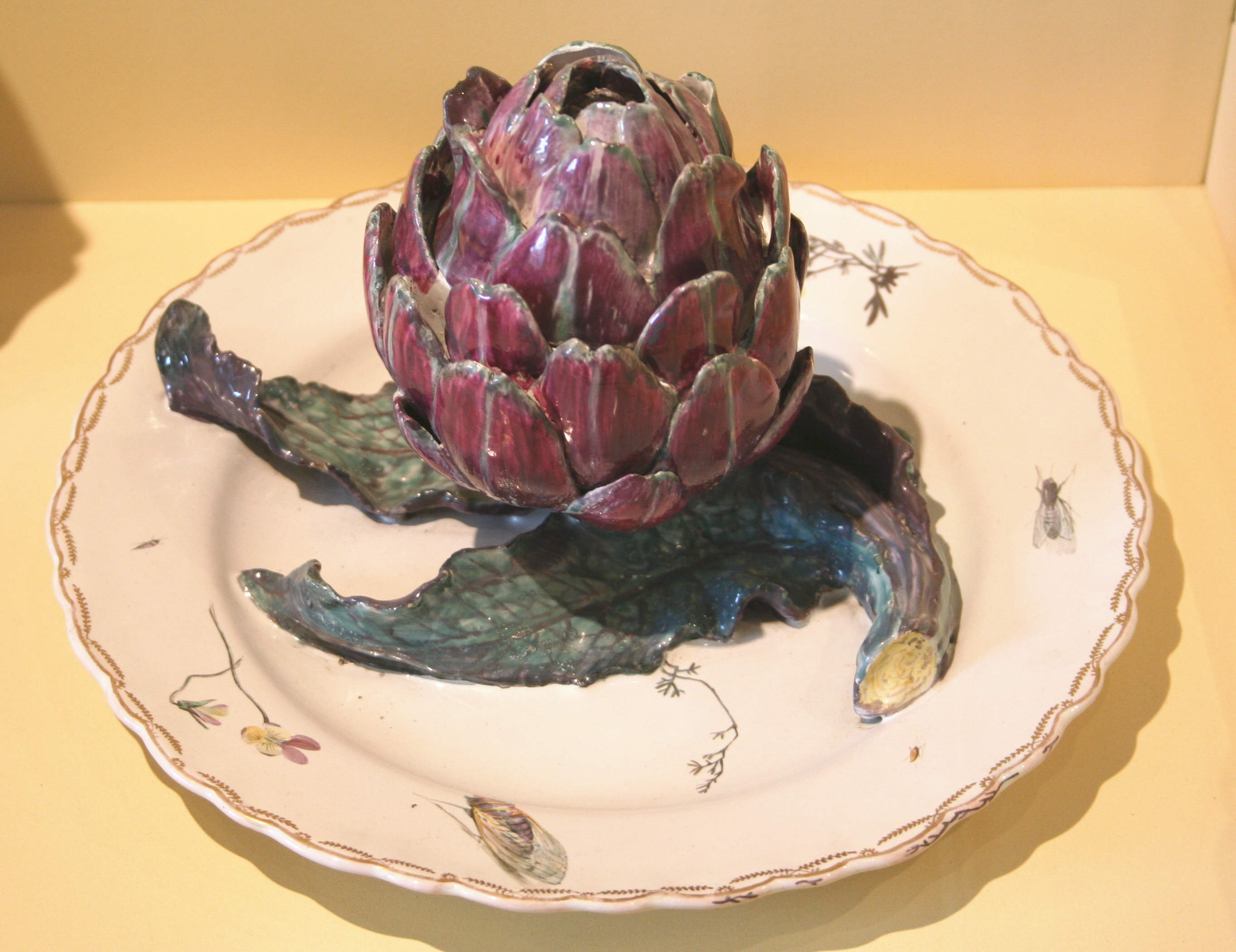
Sauce boat

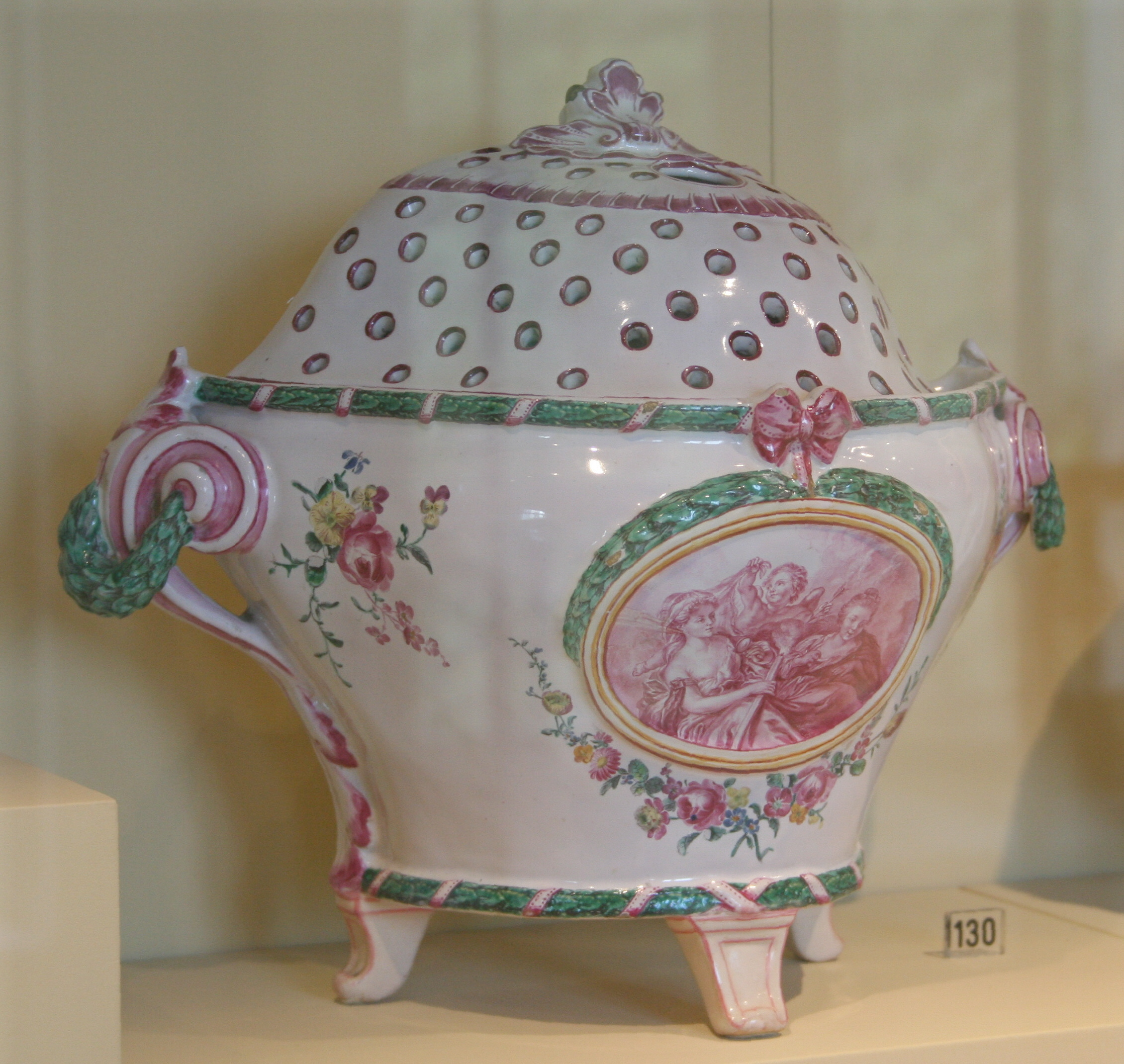
Pot pourri

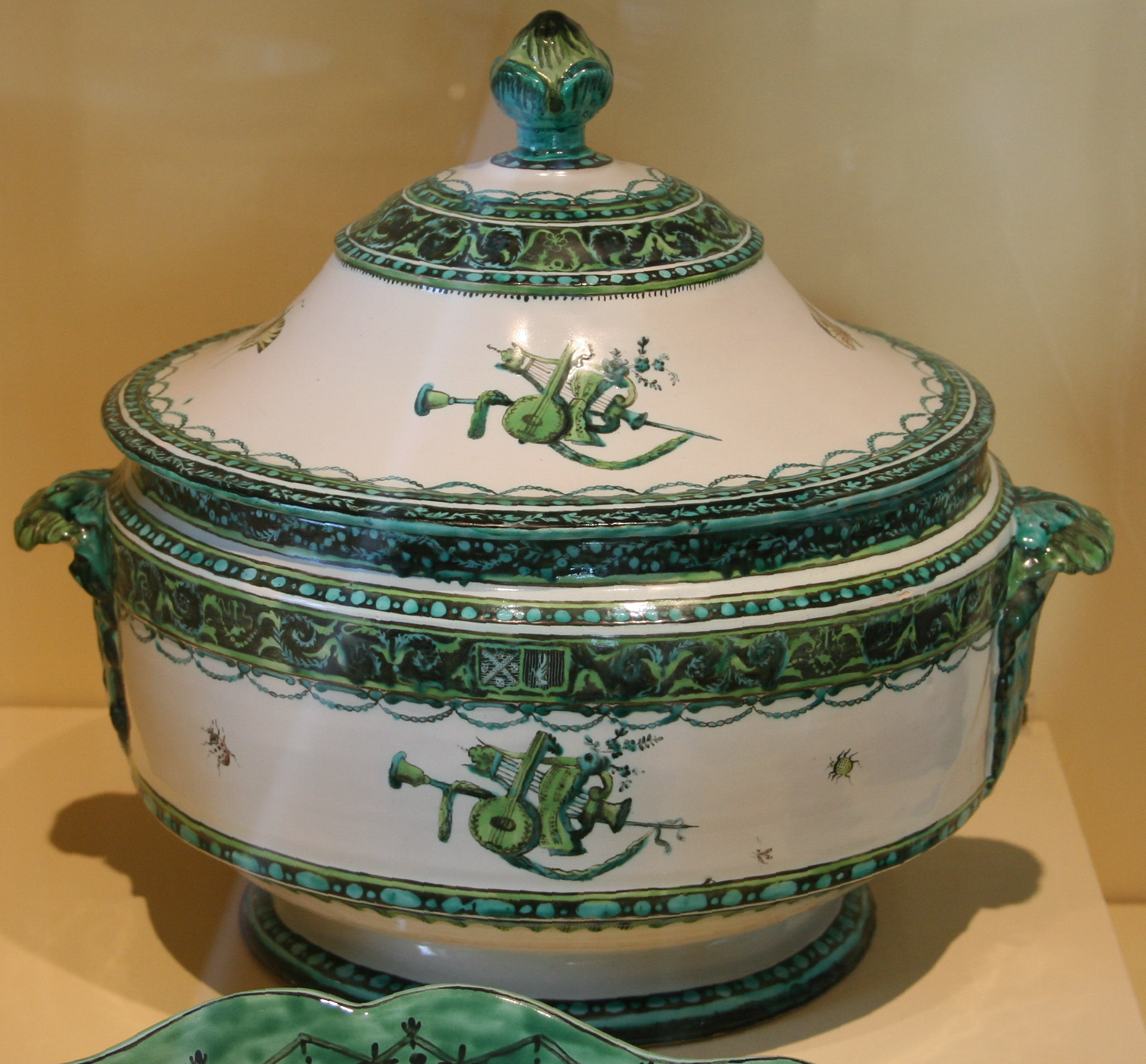
Tureen

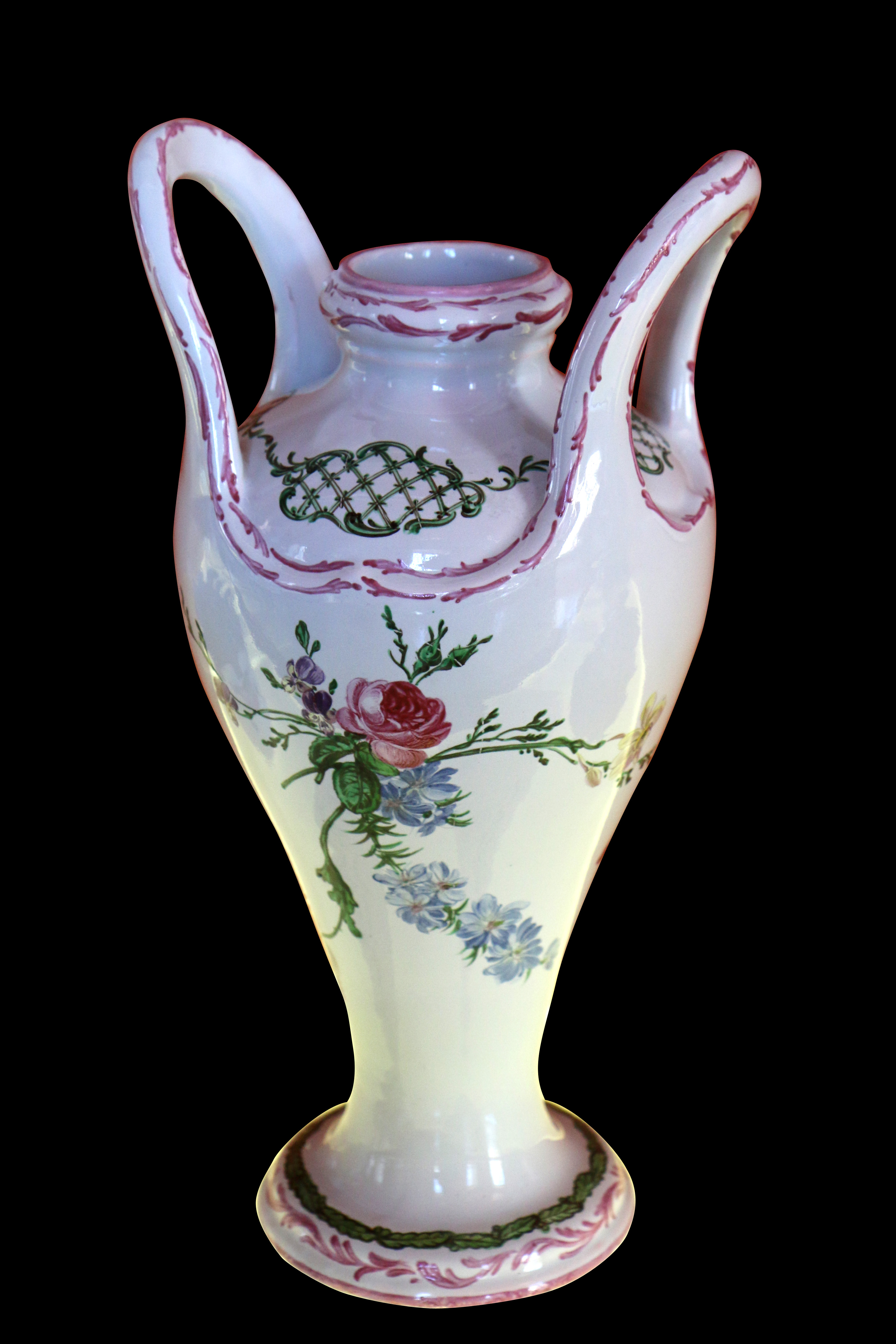
Baluster vase with handles

=== Honoré Bonnefoy ===
Honoré Bonnefoy was trained in the workshops of Gaspard Robert. In 1777, he founded a company with his brother Joseph. Bad business necessitated their separation in 1778, and he continued production alone. He used Viry, who was a member of the Academy of Painting and Sculpture. In 1793, he bought from the nation a large plot in the alleys of Meilhan, near to his workshops. He died in January 1795. His widow and her son Augustine succeeded him and developed a porcelain manufacture. The factory remained in operation until 1815, when the company was closed.

Decorative themes of this factory consist primarily of marine animals and landscapes painted in petit feu polychrome. He also developed production of statuettes.

== Other faïence ==
The museum also features faïence from Moustiers-Sainte-Marie (Alpes-de-Haute-Provence) which also manufactured a prestigious production that appeared slightly later around 1680, but which continued until 1982. A revival of this production was made in 1927 by Marcel Provence, who opened on that date a manufacturing canter and created the Academy of Moustiers. This activity is ongoing. The main faïence makers are Pierre Clérissy (1651–1728), Joseph Olérys (1697–1749) and Joseph Fouque (1720–1799). Among the many decorations used are hunting scenes, decorations "à la Bérain", mythological figures, medallions surrounded by a tied ribbon, arms, trophies with flags, Solanaceae flowers, garlands of flowers etc..

Faïence from other centers is also presented: La Tour d'Aigues, whose factory was created by Baron Bruny, Apt, Vaucluse, Castellet and Varages for provincial workshops but also Gien and modern productions.

Other faience work

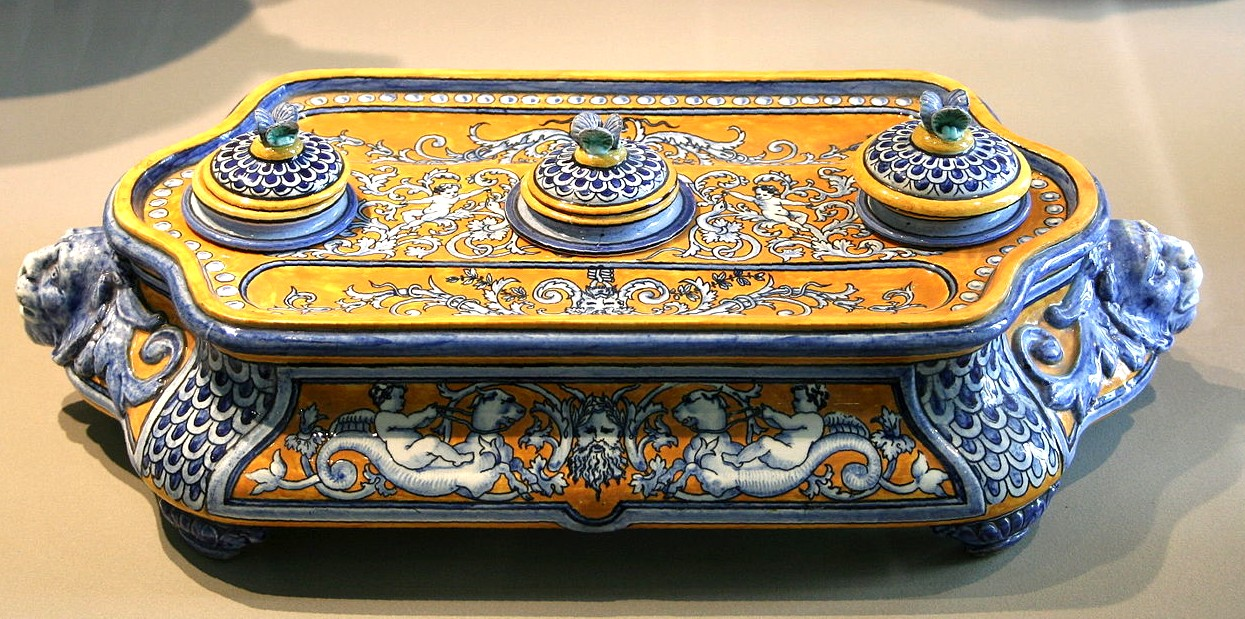
Gien ink stand

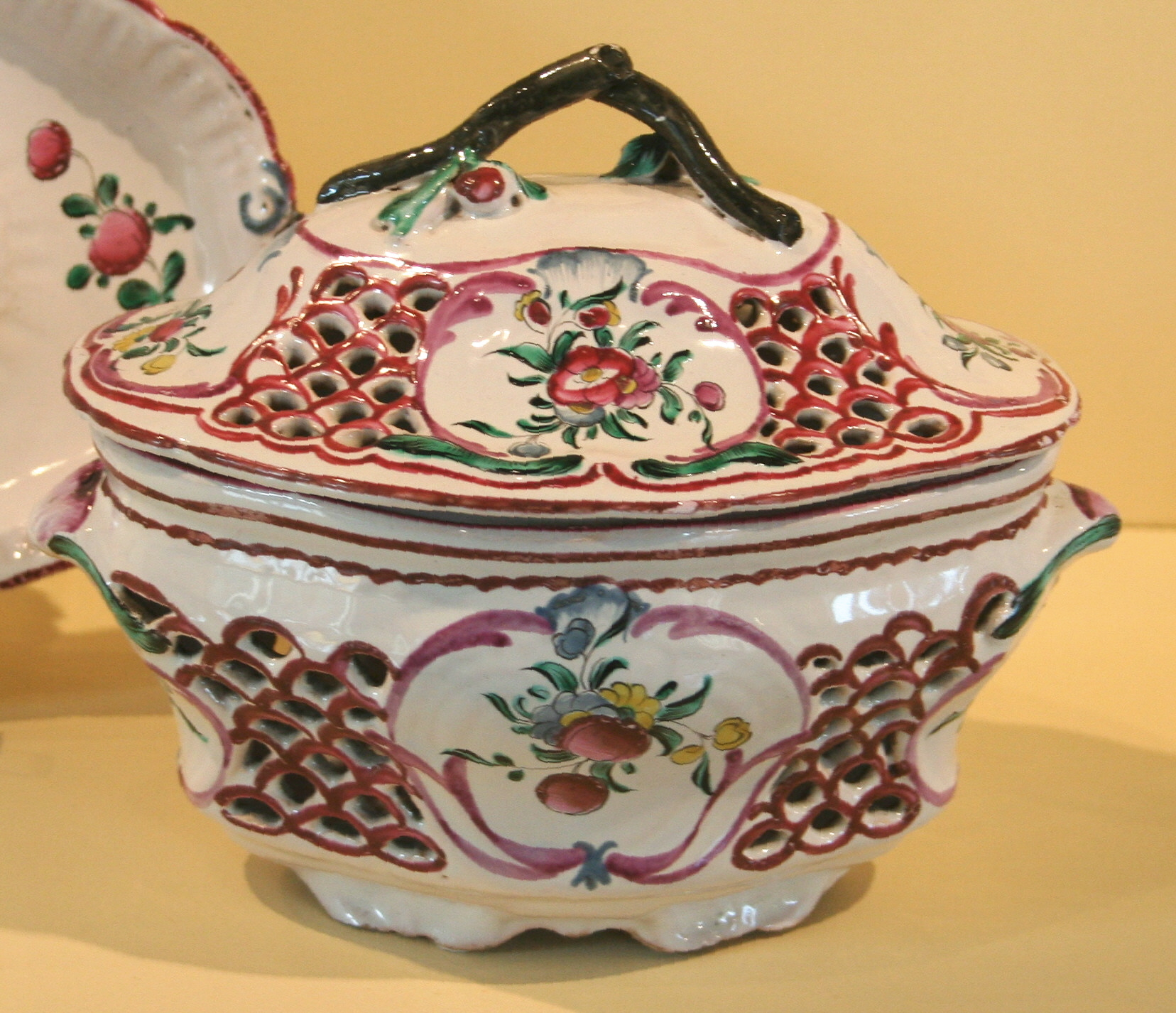
Moustiers sugar bowl

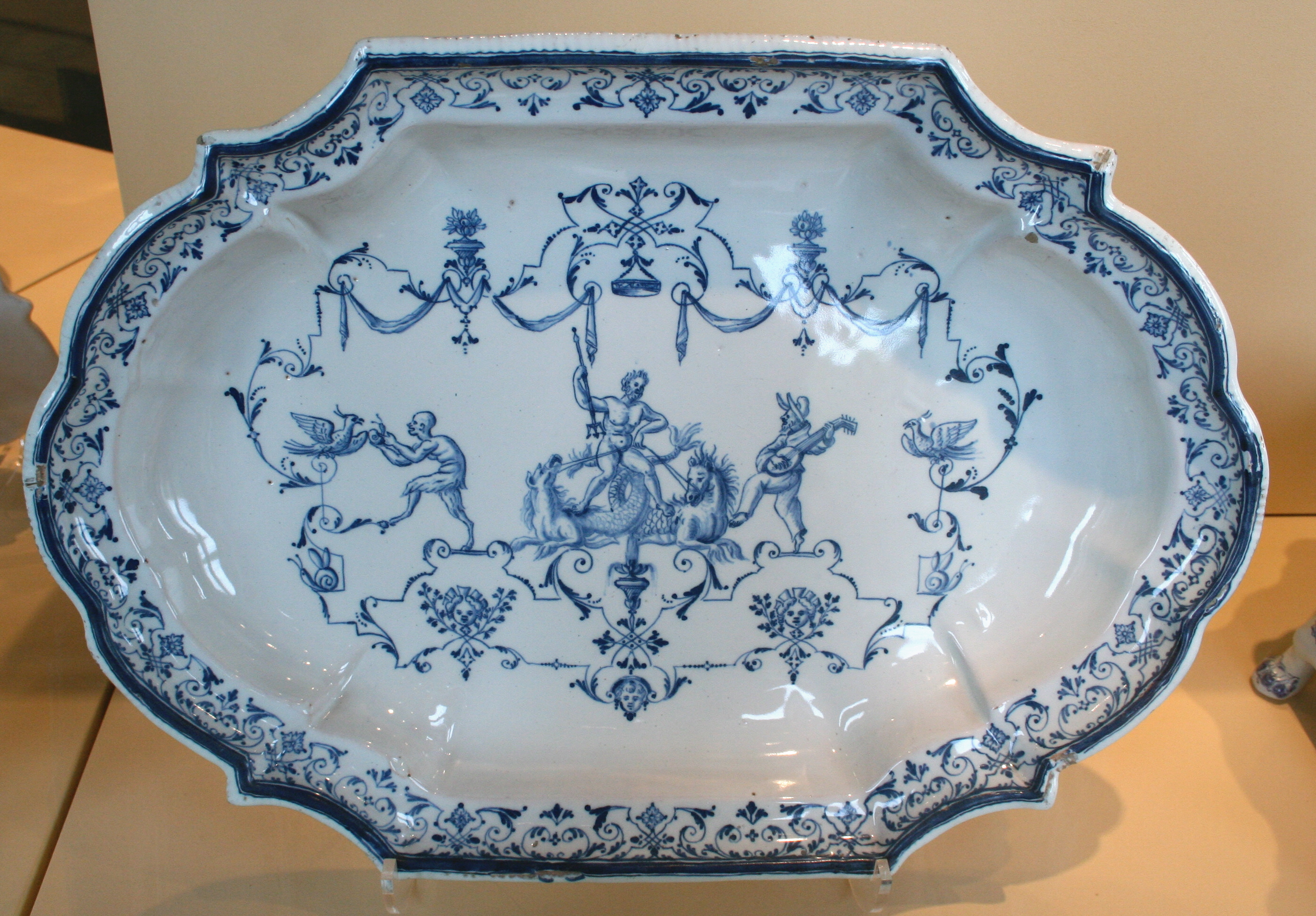
Moustiers oblong plate

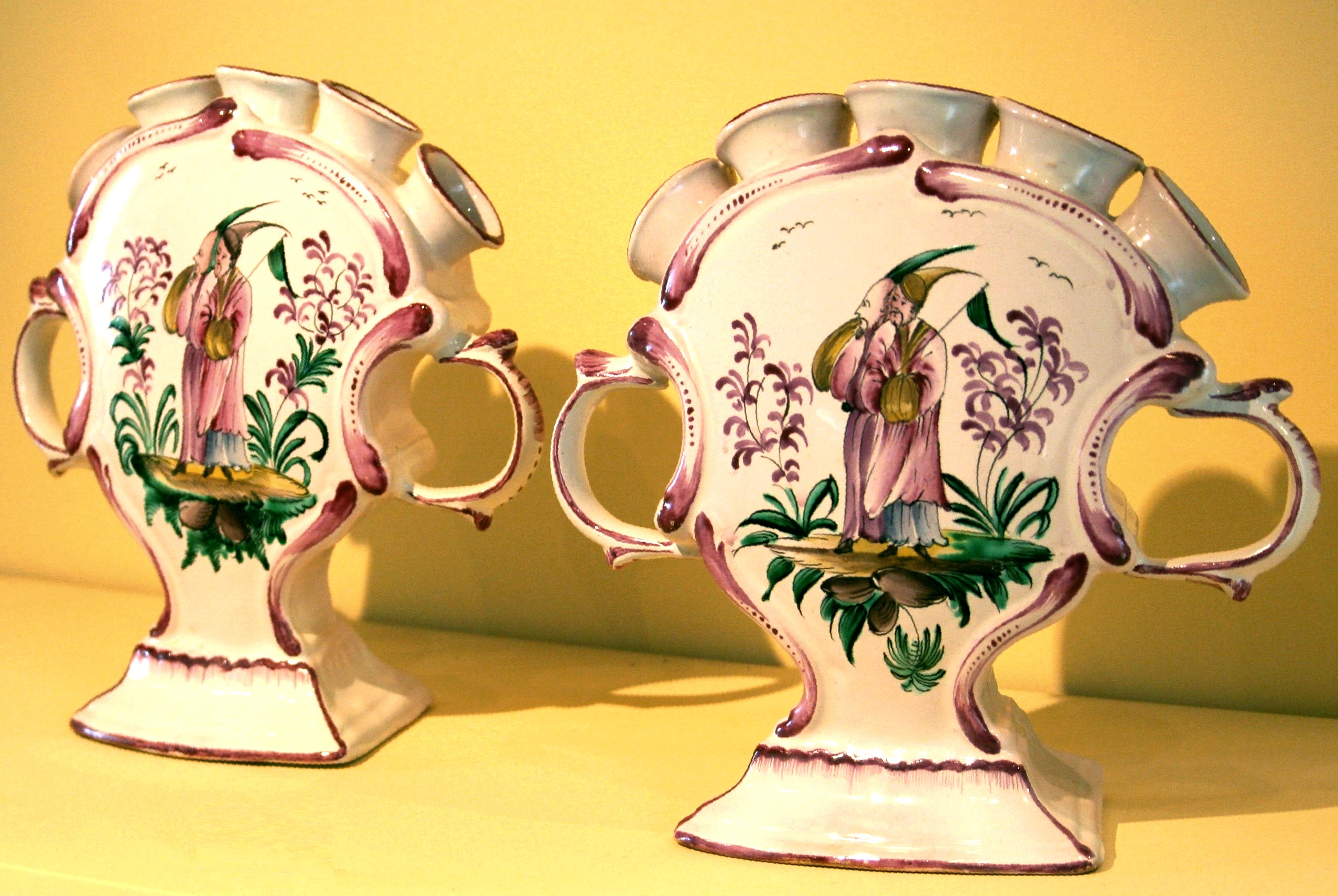
Varages tulips
