= Château Borély =

Château in Marseille, France

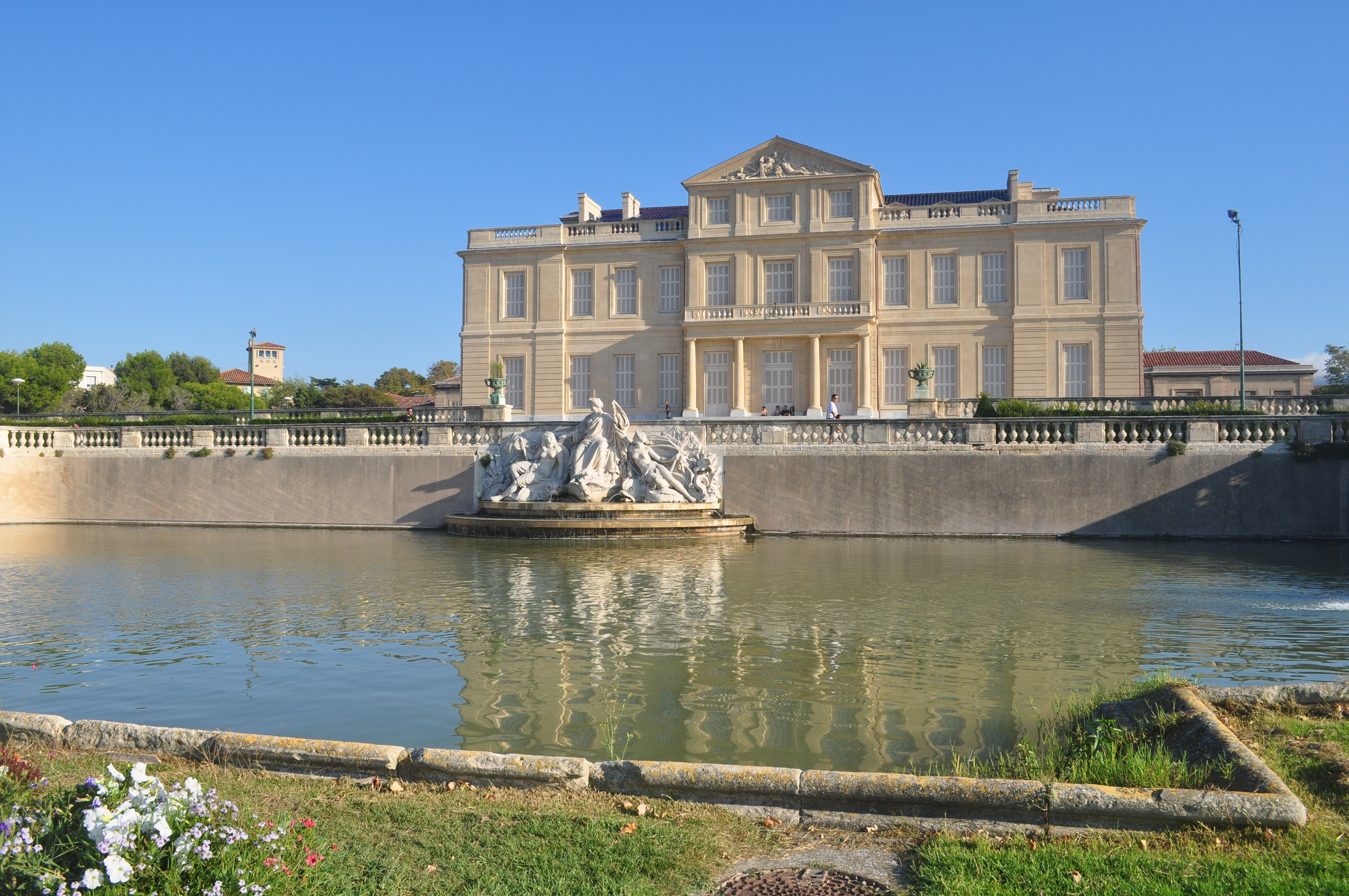

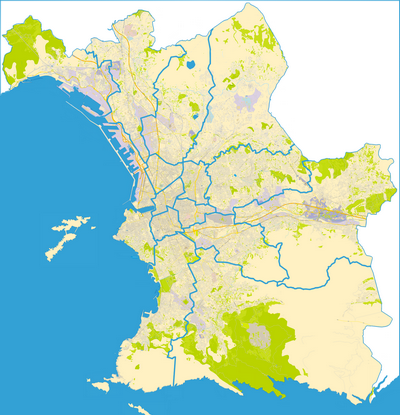
- Location within Marseille Location within France

General information
- Location: Marseille, 8th arrondissement, France
- Coordinates: 43.257423°N 5.381955°E
- Construction started: 1767
- Completed: 1778

Design and construction
- Architects: Charles-Louis Clérisseau; Esprit-Joseph Brun

The Château Borély (French pronunciation: [ʃɑto bɔʁeli]; Occitan: Castèl Borély) is a château in the southern part of Marseille, France. Associated with Parc Borély and Borély Racecourse, it has been listed as a historical monument since 1936, and has housed the Museum of the Decorative Arts, Fashion and Ceramics since Marseille-Provence 2013 with its rich original decor.

== History ==
The chateau was built in the eighteenth century for Louis Borély (1692–1768), a rich merchant of Marseille. It was donated to the city in the nineteenth century. For several years it hosted the archaeological museum. The chateau is located in the current Parc Borély.

There are plans to transfer the Faïence Museum (Musée de la Faïence de Marseille) from the Château Pastré to the Château Borély, which will also hold the planned Museum of Decorative Arts and Fashion, as part of preparations for Marseille becoming the European cultural capital in 2013.
