= Marseille Borély Racecourse =

Horse racing facility in Marseille, France

Coordinates: 43°15′28″N 5°22′44″E

Marseille Borély Racecourse with Château Borély on the right

Marseille Borély Racecourse (French: Hippodrome de Marseille-Borély) is a horse racing facility for thoroughbred flat racing and standardbred harness racing located at 16, Avenue de Bonneveine in the 8th arrondissement of Marseille, France.

== History ==
The race track was established in 1860. Its current grandstand and other amenities were built in 1999.
