= Faience =

Tin-glazed pottery

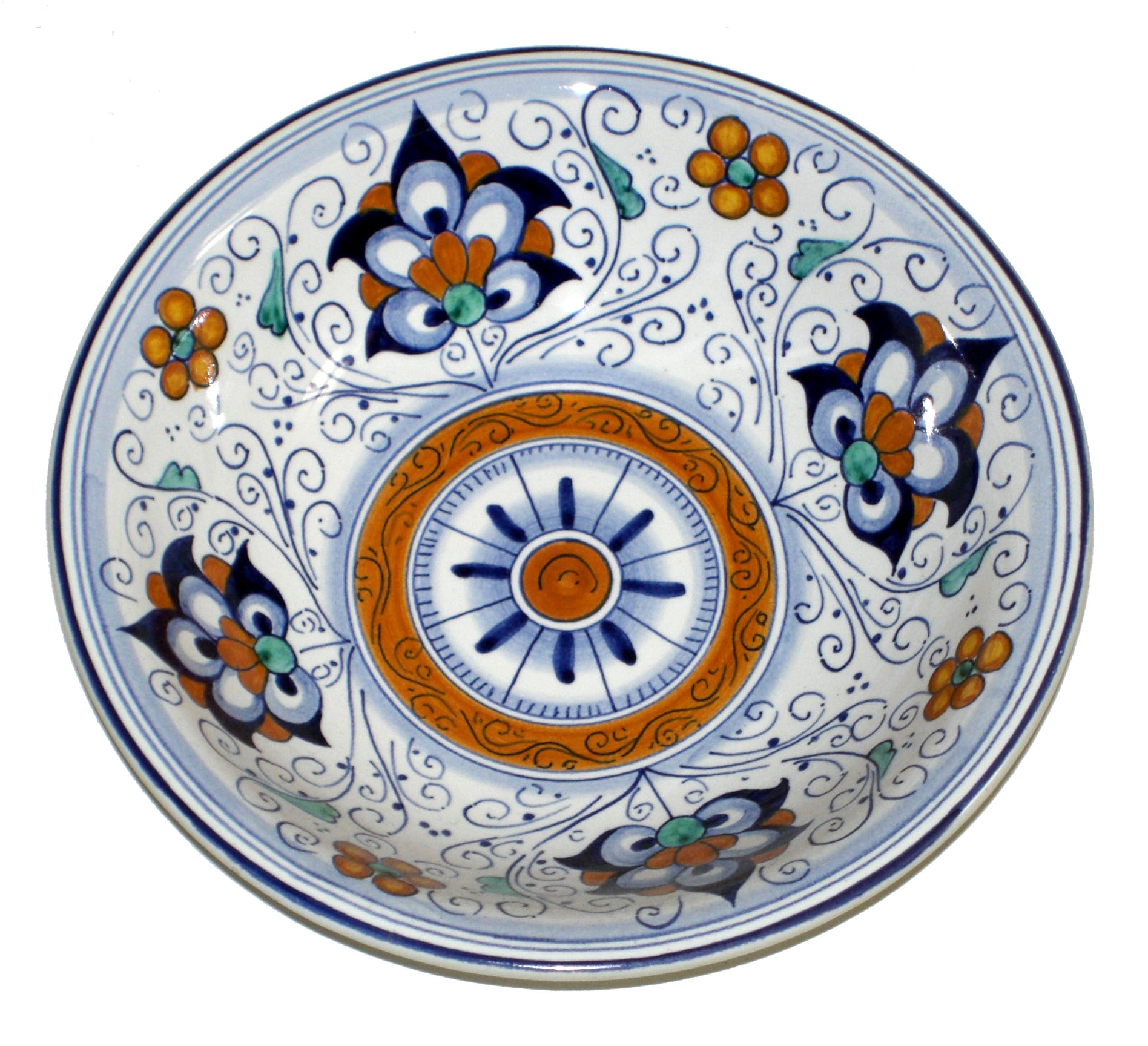
Modern bowl in a traditional pattern, made in Faenza, Italy, which gave its name to the type

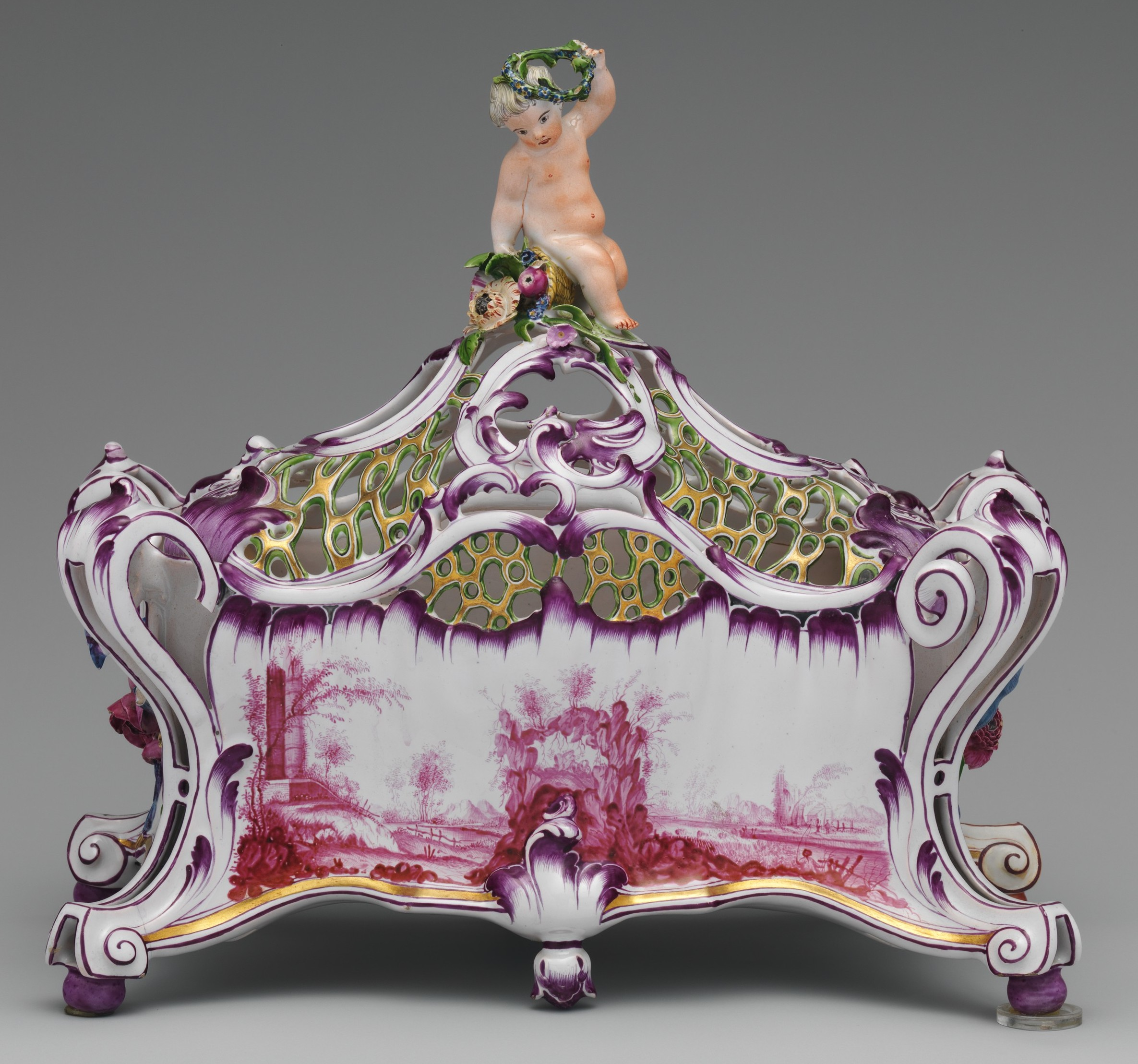
Sophisticated Rococo Niderviller faience, by a French factory that also made porcelain, 1760–65

Faience or faïence (/faɪˈɑːns, feɪˈ-, -ˈɒ̃s/, French: [fajɑ̃s]) is the general English language term for fine tin-glazed pottery. The invention of a white pottery glaze suitable for painted decoration, by the addition of an oxide of tin to the slip of a lead glaze, was a major advance in the history of pottery. The invention seems to have been made in Iran or the Middle East before the ninth century. A kiln capable of producing temperatures exceeding 1,000 °C (1,830 °F) was required to achieve this result, after millennia of refined pottery-making traditions. The term is now used for a wide variety of pottery from several parts of the world, including many types of European painted wares, often produced as cheaper versions of porcelain styles.

English generally uses various other terms for well-known sub-types of faience. Italian tin-glazed earthenware, at least the early forms, is called maiolica in English, Dutch wares are called Delftware, and their English equivalents English delftware, leaving "faience" as the normal term in English for French, German, Spanish, Portuguese wares and those of other countries not mentioned (it is also the usual French term, and fayence in German). The name faience is simply the French name for Faenza, near Ravenna in the Romagna region of Italy, where a painted majolica ware on a clean, opaque pure-white ground was produced for export as early as the fifteenth century.

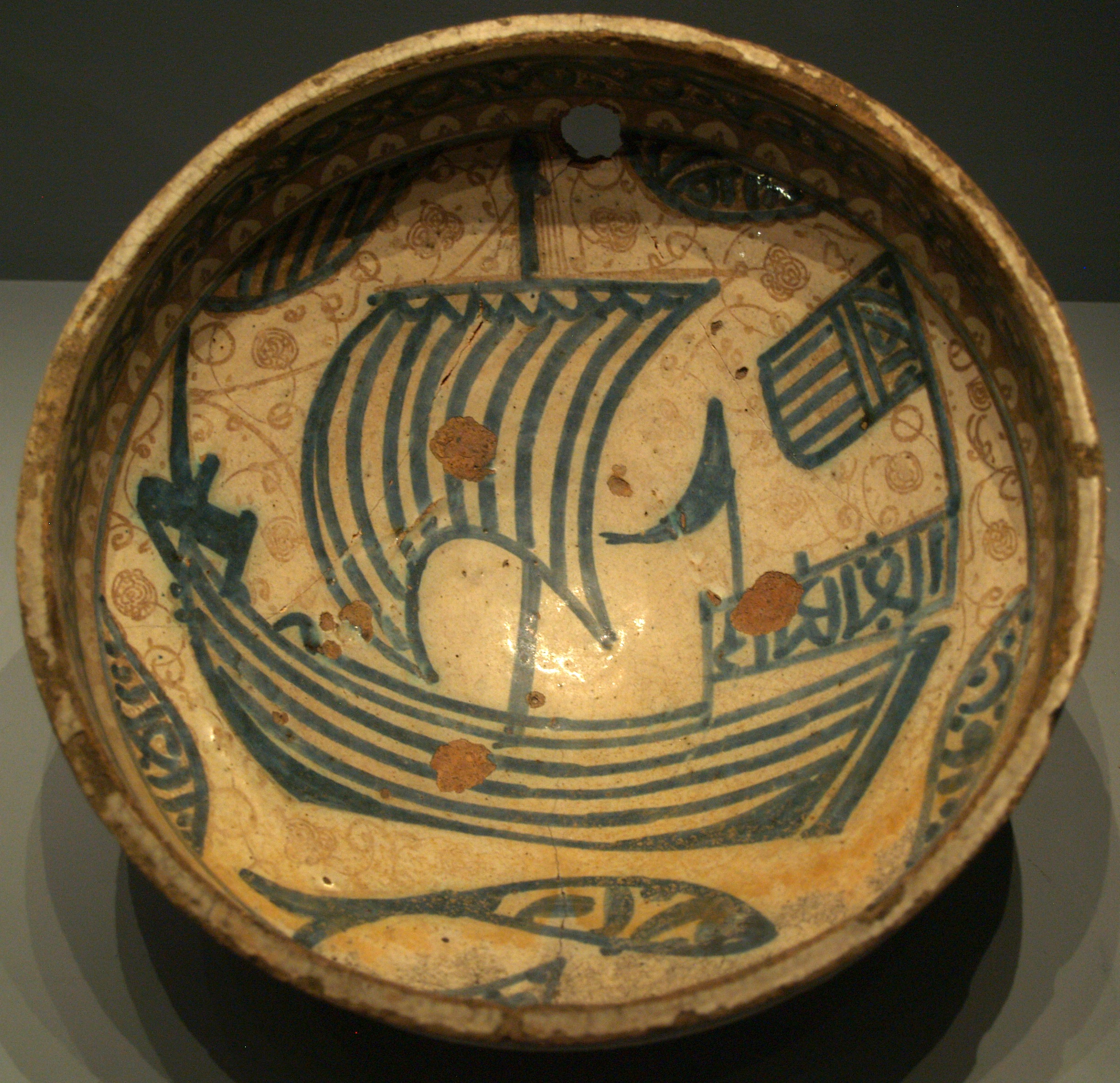
Hispano-Moresque ware dish from Manises, 15th century, the earliest type of European faience

Technically, lead-glazed earthenware, such as the French sixteenth-century Saint-Porchaire ware, does not qualify as faience, but the distinction is not usually maintained. Semi-vitreous stoneware may be glazed like faience. Egyptian faience is not really faience, or pottery, at all, but made of a vitreous frit, and so closer to glass.

In English 19th-century usage "faience" was often used to describe "any earthenware with relief modelling decorated with coloured glazes", including much glazed architectural terracotta and Victorian majolica, adding a further complexity to the list of meanings of the word.

== History ==
=== Western Mediterranean ===
The Muslims brought the technique of tin-glazed earthenware to Al-Andalus, where the art of lustreware with metallic glazes was perfected. From at least the 14th century, Málaga in Andalusia and later Valencia exported these "Hispano-Moresque wares", either directly or via the Balearic Islands to Italy and the rest of Europe. Later these industries continued under Christian lords.

"Majolica" and "maiolica" are garbled versions of "Maiorica", the island of Mallorca, which was a transshipping point for refined tin-glazed earthenwares shipped to Italy from the kingdom of Aragon at the close of the Middle Ages. This type of pottery owed much to its Andalusi inheritance.

In Italy, locally produced tin-glazed earthenwares, now called maiolica, initiated in the fourteenth century, reached a peak in the late fifteenth and early sixteenth centuries. After about 1600, these lost their appeal to elite customers, and the quality of painting declined, with geometric designs and simple shapes replacing the complicated and sophisticated scenes of the best period. Production continues to the present day in many centres, and the wares are again called "faience" in English (though usually still maiolica in Italian). At some point "faience" as a term for pottery from Faenza in northern Italy was a general term used in French, and then reached English.

=== French and northern European faïence ===
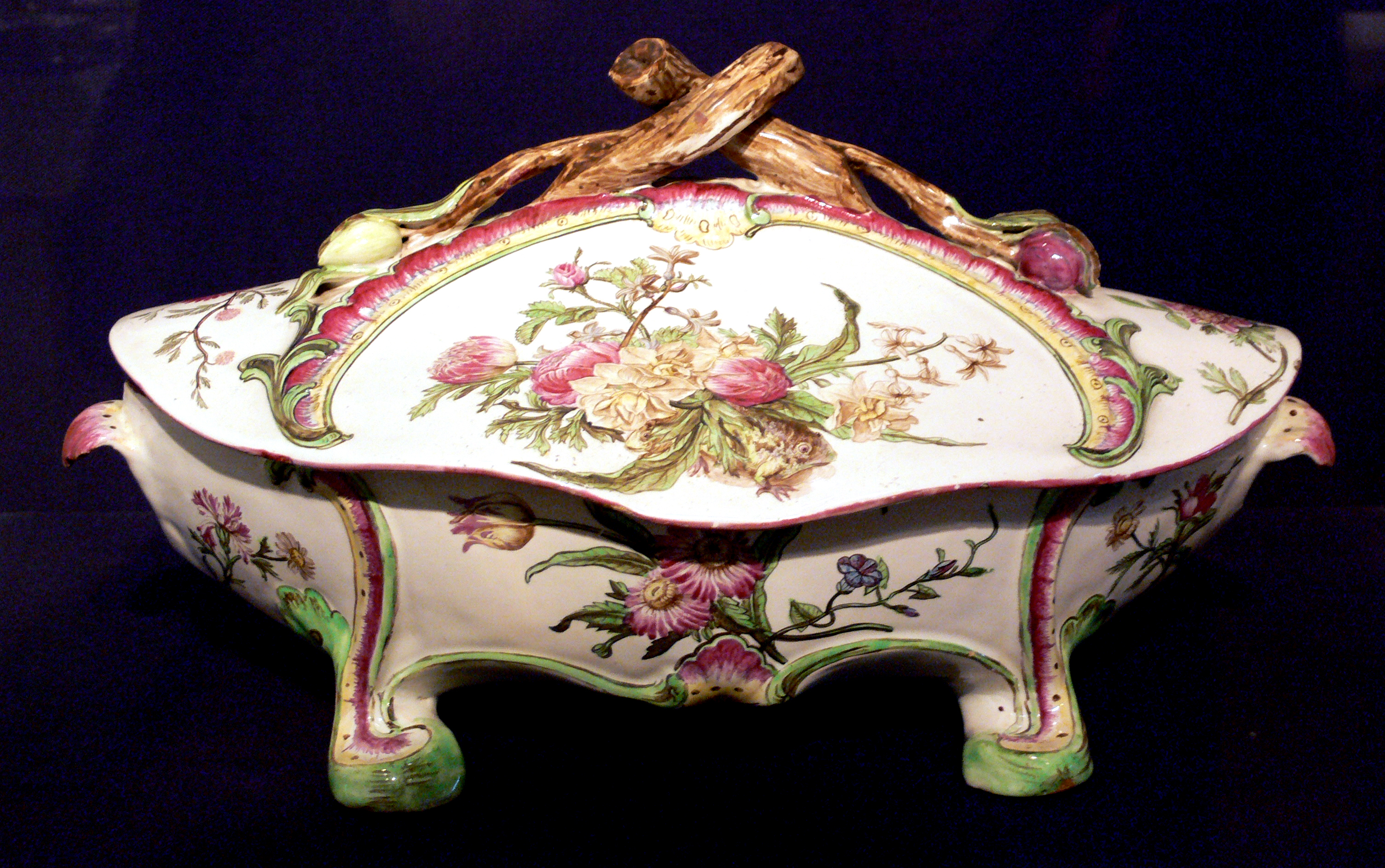
Rococo tureen, Marseille, c. 1770

The first northerners to imitate the tin-glazed earthenwares being imported from Italy were the Dutch. Delftware is a kind of faience, made at potteries round Delft in the Netherlands, characteristically decorated in blue on white. It began in the early sixteenth century on a relatively small scale, imitating Italian maiolica, but from around 1580 it began to imitate the highly sought-after blue and white Chinese export porcelain that was beginning to reach Europe, soon followed by Japanese export porcelain. From the later half of the century the Dutch were manufacturing and exporting very large quantities, some in its own recognisably Dutch style, as well as copying East Asian porcelain.

In France, the first well-known painter of faïence was Masseot Abaquesne, established in Rouen in the 1530s. Nevers faience and Rouen faience were the leading French centres of faience manufacturing in the 17th century, both able to supply wares to the standards required by the court and nobility. Nevers continued the Italian istoriato maiolica style, painted with figurative subjects, until around 1650. Many others centres developed from the early 18th century, led in 1690 by Quimper in Brittany , followed by Moustiers, Marseille, Strasbourg and Lunéville and many smaller centres. The cluster of factories in the south were generally the most innovative, while Strasbourg and other centres near the Rhine were much influenced by German porcelain.

The products of faience manufactories are identified by the usual methods of ceramic connoisseurship: the character of the clay body, the character and palette of the glaze, and the style of decoration, faïence blanche being left in its undecorated fired white slip. Faïence parlante (especially from Nevers) bears mottoes often on decorative labels or banners. Apothecary wares, including albarelli, can bear the names of their intended contents, generally in Latin and often so abbreviated to be unrecognizable to the untutored eye. Mottoes of fellowships and associations became popular in the 18th century, leading to the faïence patriotique that was a specialty of the years of the French Revolution.

"English delftware" produced in Lambeth, London, and at other centres, from the late sixteenth century, provided apothecaries with jars for wet and dry drugs, among a wide range of wares. Large painted dishes were produced for weddings and other special occasions, with crude decoration that later appealed to collectors of English folk art. Many of the early potters in London were Flemish. By about 1600, blue-and-white wares were being produced, labelling the contents within decorative borders. The production was slowly superseded in the first half of the eighteenth century with the introduction of cheap creamware.

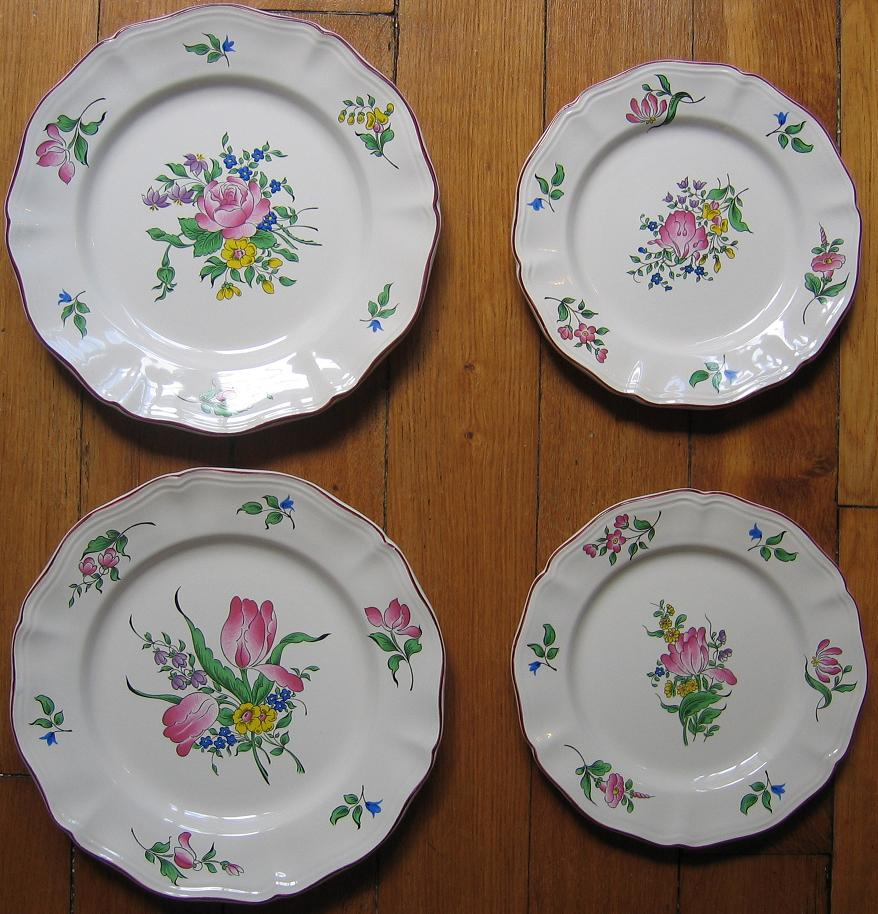
Luneville faience

Dutch potters in northern (and Protestant) Germany established German centres of faience: the first manufactories in Germany were opened at Hanau (1661) and Heusenstamm (1662), soon moved to nearby Frankfurt. In Switzerland, Zunfthaus zur Meisen near Fraumünster church houses the porcelain and faience collection of the Swiss National Museum in Zürich.

By the mid-18th centuries many French factories produced (as well as simpler wares) pieces that followed the Rococo styles of the French porcelain factories and often hired and trained painters with the skill to produce work of a quality that sometimes approached them.

The products of French faience manufactories, rarely marked, are identified by the usual methods of ceramic connoisseurship: the character of the body, the character and palette of the glaze, and the style of decoration, faïence blanche being left in its undecorated fired white slip. Faïence parlante bears mottoes often on decorative labels or banners. Wares for apothecaries, including albarello, can bear the names of their intended contents, generally in Latin and often so abbreviated to be unrecognizable to the untutored eye. Mottoes of fellowships and associations became popular in the 18th century, leading to the Faïence patriotique that was a specialty of the years of the French Revolution.

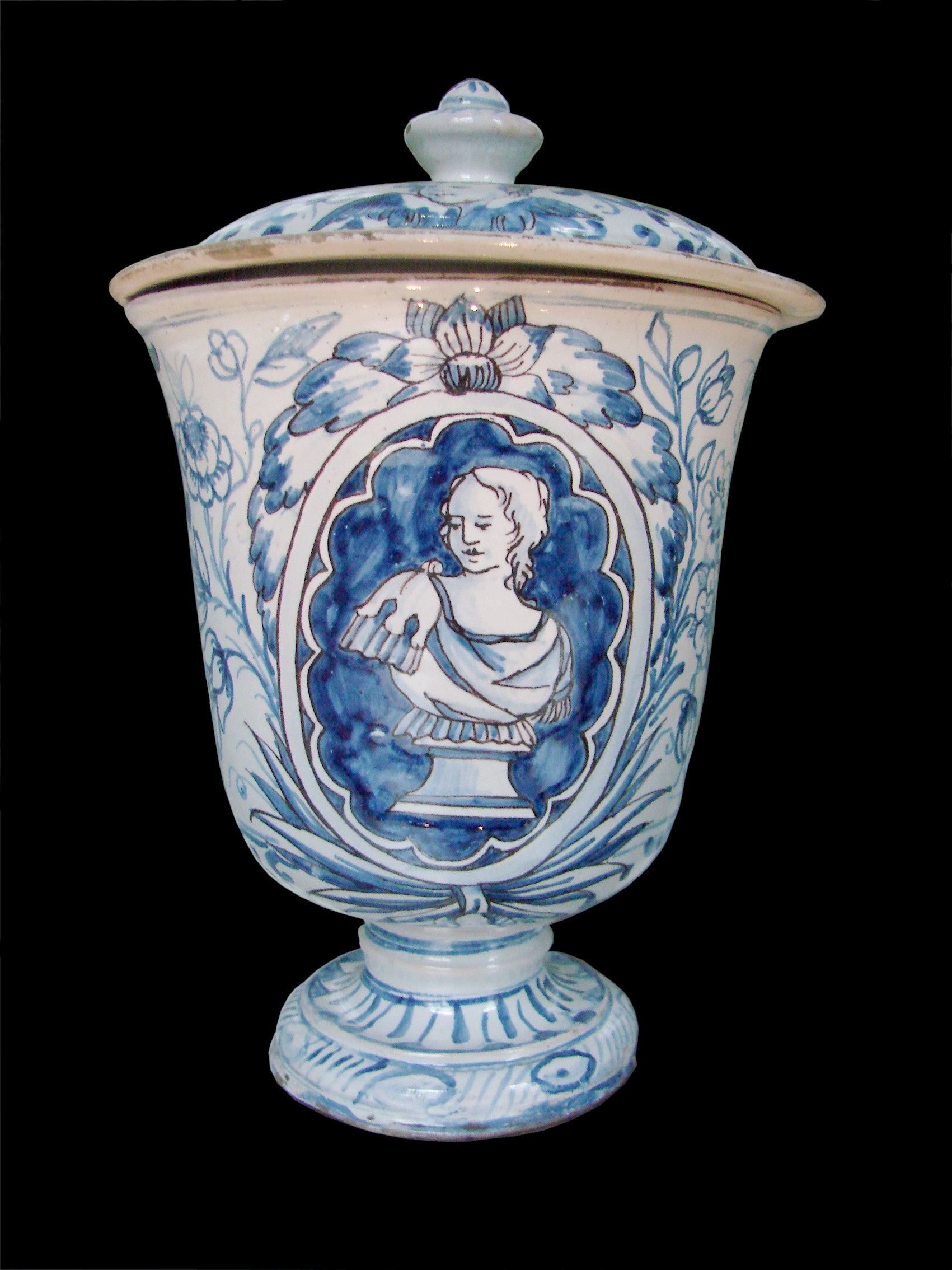
By the mid-18th century, glazed earthenware made in Liguria was imitating decors of its Dutch and French rivals.

In the course of the later 18th century, cheaper porcelain, and the refined earthenwares first developed in Staffordshire pottery such as creamware took over the market for refined faience. The French industry was given a nearly fatal blow by a commercial treaty with Great Britain in 1786, much lobbied for by Josiah Wedgwood, which set the import duty on English earthenware at a nominal level. In the early 19th century, fine stoneware—fired so hot that the unglazed body vitrifies—closed the last of the traditional makers' ateliers even for beer steins. At the low end of the market, local manufactories continued to supply regional markets with coarse and simple wares, and many local varieties have continued to be made in versions of the old styles as a form of folk art, and today for tourists.

=== Revival ===
In the 19th century two glazing techniques revived by Minton were: 1. Tin-glazed pottery in the style of Renaissance Italian maiolica and, 2. The pottery of coloured glazes decoration over unglazed earthenware molded in low relief. At the Great Exhibition of 1851 and at the International Exhibition of 1862 both were exhibited. Both are known today as Victorian majolica. The coloured glazes majolica wares were later also made by Wedgwood and numerous smaller Staffordshire potteries round Burslem and Stoke-on-Trent. At the end of the nineteenth century, William de Morgan re-discovered the technique of lustered faience "to an extraordinarily high standard".

=== Ancient frit wares called "faience" ===
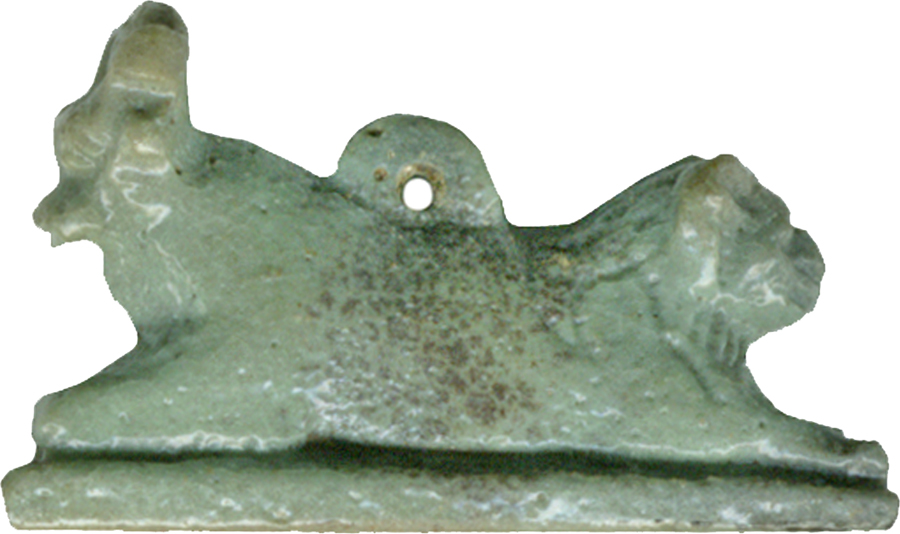
Egyptian pendant of lions or Apis Bull. The Walters Art Museum.

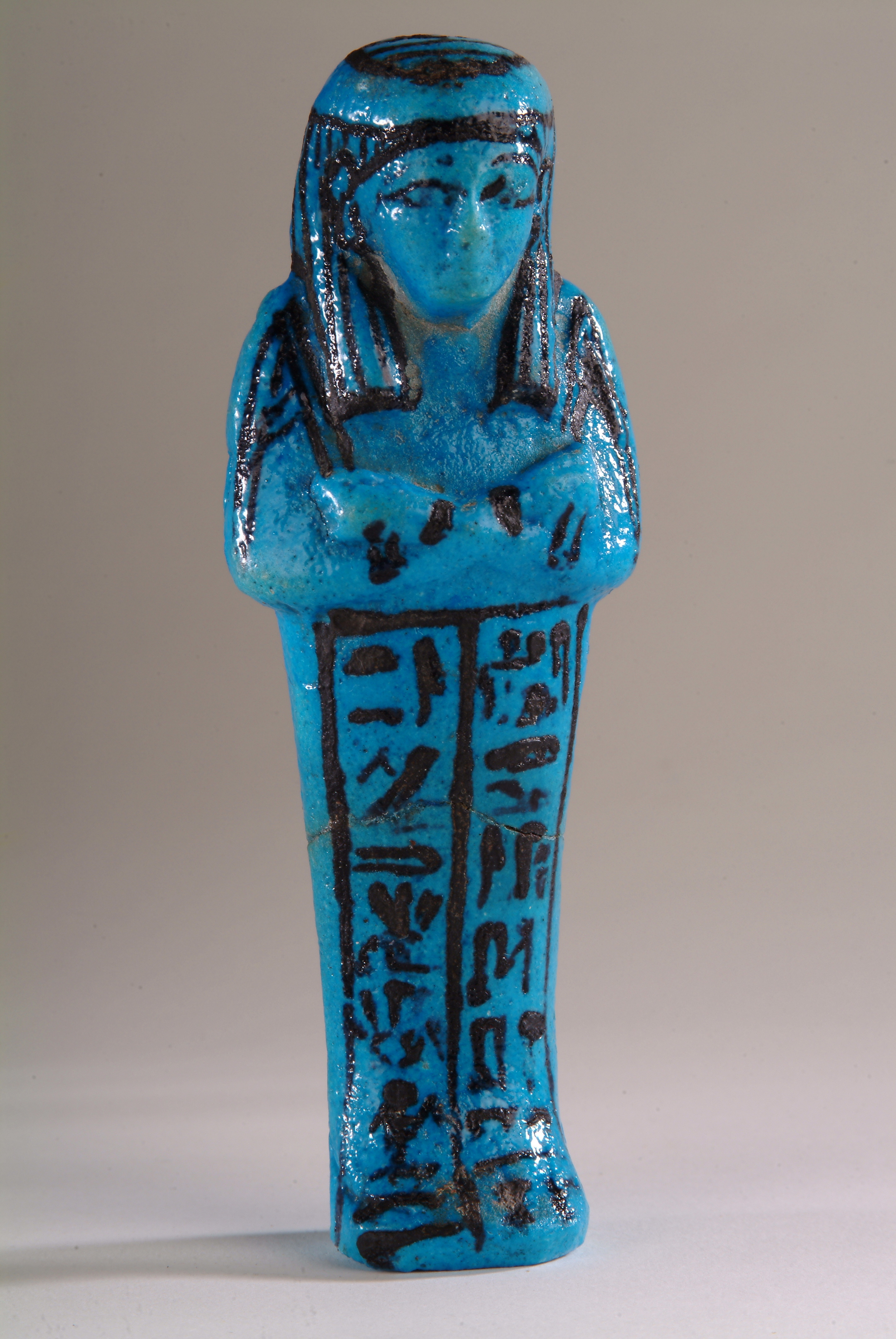
shabti figure in Egyptian faience

The term faience broadly encompassed finely glazed ceramic beads, figures and other small objects found in Egypt as early as 4000 BC, as well as in the Ancient Near East, the Indus Valley Civilisation and Europe. However, this material is not pottery at all, containing no clay, but a vitreous frit, either self-glazing or glazed. The Metropolitan Museum of Art displays a piece known as "William the Faience Hippopotamus" from Meir, Egypt, dated to the Twelfth Dynasty of Egypt, c. 1981–1885 BC. Different to those of ancient Egypt in theme and composition, artefacts of the Nubian Kingdom of Kerma are characterized by extensive amounts of blue faience, which was developed by the natives of Kerma independently of Egyptian techniques. Examples of ancient faience are also found in Minoan Crete, which was likely influenced by Egyptian culture. Faience material, for instance, has been recovered from the Knossos archaeological site.

== Types ==
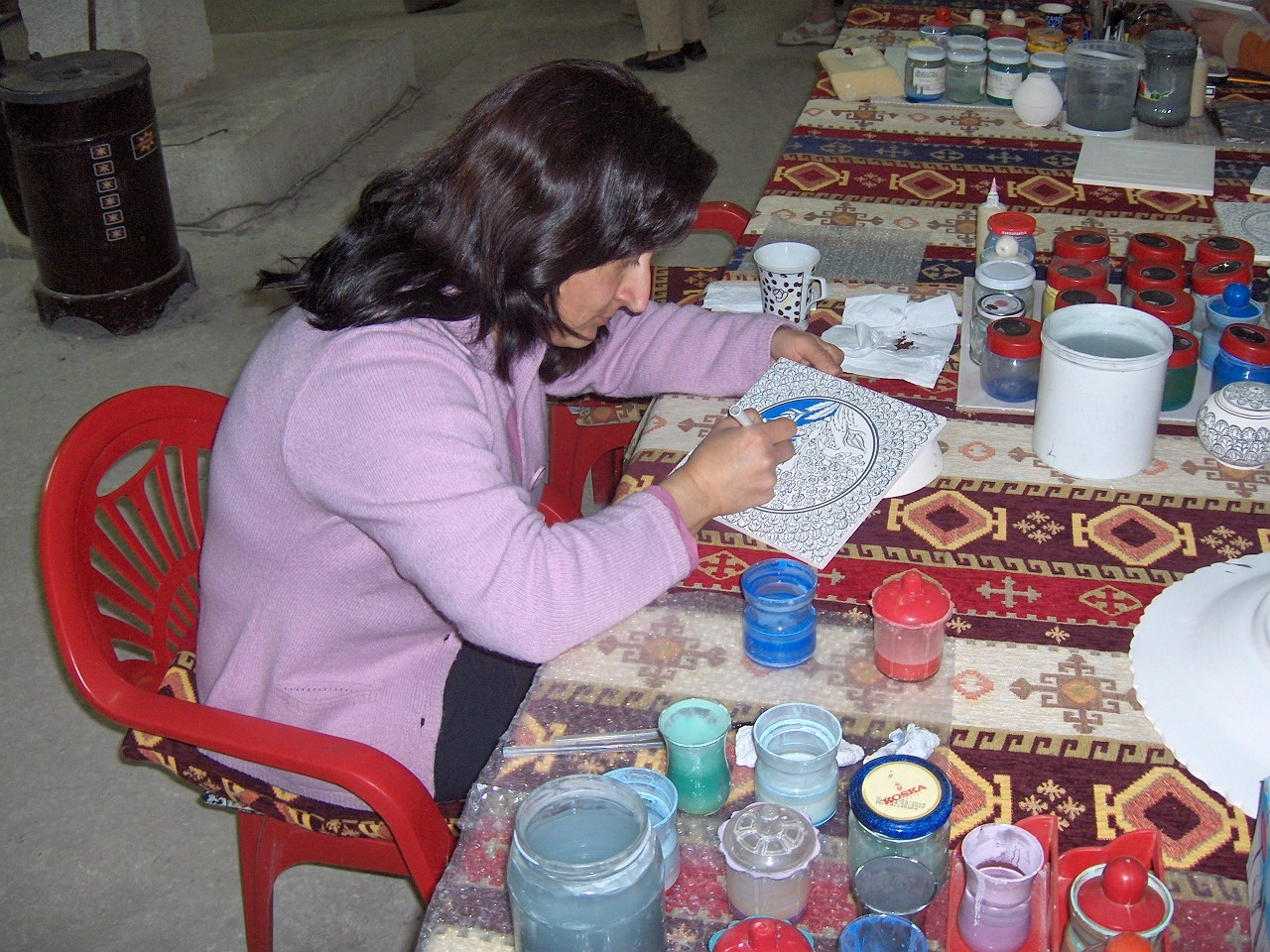
Painting a plate before firing in a kiln, Gülşehir, Cappadocia, Turkey

Many centres of traditional manufacture are recognized, as well as some individual ateliers. A partial list follows.

=== Austria ===
- Gmunden (pottery)

=== Canada ===
- Blue Mountain Pottery

=== Denmark ===
- Aluminia
- Bing & Grøndahl
- Kastrup Værk
- Porcelænshaven
- Royal Copenhagen

=== England ===
English delftware is a term for English faience, mostly of the 17th and early 18th centuries. Not all of it imitated Dutch delftware, though much did. It was replaced by the much better creamware and other types of refined earthenware Staffordshire pottery developed in the 18th century, many of which did not need tin-glazes to achieve a white colour. These were hugely successful and exported to Europe and the Americas. They are not called "faience" in English, but may be in other languages, e.g. creamware was known as faience fine in France.

=== France ===
- Nevers faience
- Lyon Faience
- Rouen faience
- Marseille: Veuve Perrin, Gaspard Robert, Joseph Fauchier, Honoré Savy and other factories
- Quimper faience
- Niderviller pottery
- Aprey Faience
- Moustiers faience, of the Ateliers Clérissy
- Strasbourg faience
- Lunéville Faience
- Gien Faience, including the Faïencerie de Gien
- Creil-Montereau faience
- Mesves sur Loire faience
- Montpellier faience
- Saint-Porchaire ware, for comparison

=== Germany ===
- Abtsbessingen faience
- Hanau faience (1661–1810) – first producer in Germany
- Nürnberg faience
- Öttingen–Schrattenhofen faience
- Poppelsdorf faience – Kurfürstliche Fayencerie Poppelsdorf (1755–1829)
- Proskau faience – biggest Silesian producer (1763–1853)
- Schleswig faience
- Stockelsdorf faience
- Stralsund faience (closed 1792)

=== Italy ===
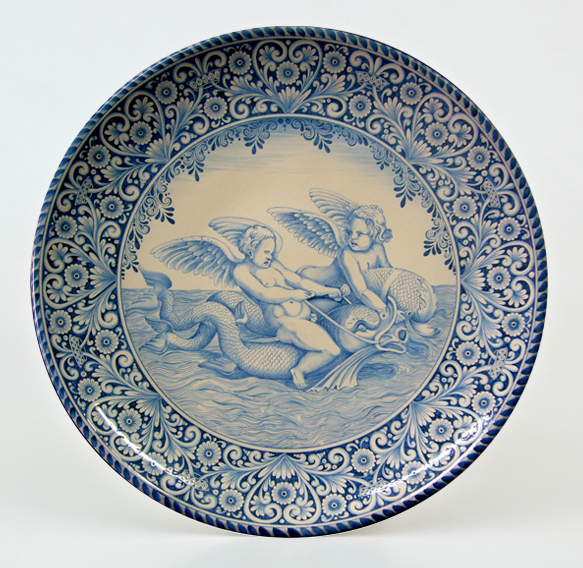
Faience from Laterza, Italy

- Faenza faience
- Laterza faience
- Savona faience
- Turin faience
- Lodi faience

=== Netherlands ===
- Boerenbont
- Delftware
- Gouda (pottery)
- Koninklijke Porceleyne Fles
- Loosdrechts Porselein
- Regina (pottery)
- Royal Tichelaar
- Weesp Porselein

=== Norway ===
- Herrebøe Faience Factory
- Stavangerflint

=== Mexico ===
- Talavera (pottery)

=== Poland ===
- Belwederan faience
- Wolff and Bernardi faience
- Włocławek faience

=== Russia ===
- Gzhel

=== Spain ===
- Manises (faience manufactory)
- Royal Factory of Alcora faience
- Royal Factory of La Moncloa
- Royal Factory of Sargadelos
- Talavera de la Reina pottery

=== Sweden ===
- Rörstrand

=== United States ===
- California Faience (Berkeley)
- Ephraim Faience Pottery
- Herman Carl Mueller, Mueller Mosaic Company, Trenton, New Jersey
- Lonhuda Pottery Company
- Weller pottery
- Florida Faience, Martin Cushman, (Mt Plymouth Fl)

== See also ==
- Clockarium
- Delftware
- Lusterware
- Musée de la Faïence de Marseille

== Bibliography ==
- (Royal Pharmaceutical Society) "English Delftware Storage Jars"
- German faience beer steins
- "Tin-glazed earthenware from Port Royal, Jamaica" Archaeology reveals English, Russian and Dutch wares.
- Russian national faience craft
- Russian Faience factory
