= Joseph Fauchier =

Manufacturer of faïence

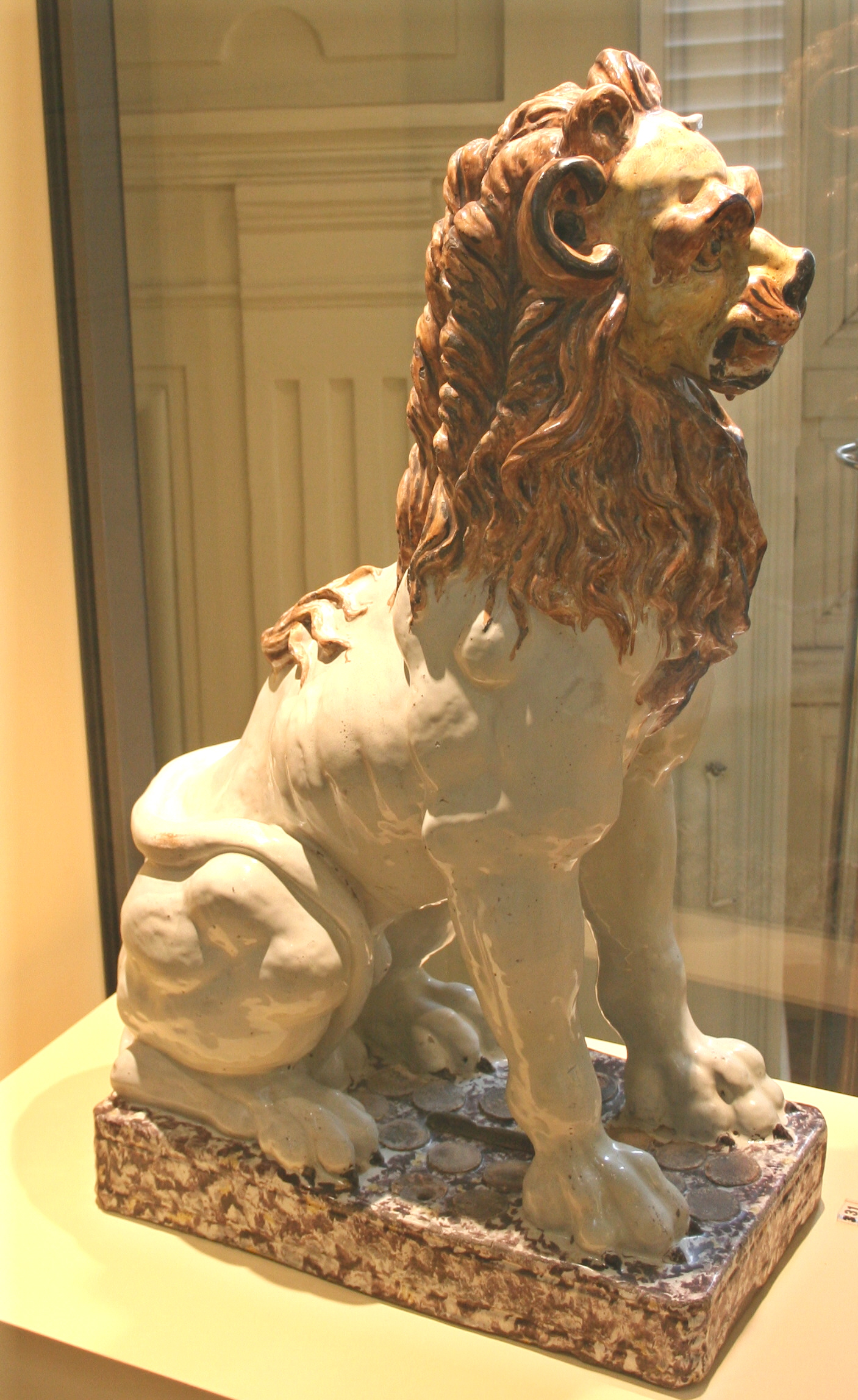
- Seated lion
- Founded: 1710
- Founder: Joseph Fauchier
- Defunct: 1795
- Headquarters: Marseille, Province of Prvence, France
- Products: Faïence

Joseph Fauchier (1687–1751) was a manufacturer of faïence, in Marseille, France. The family firm business lasted from 1710 until 1795.

== History ==
Joseph Fauchier was born in Peyruis in the Alpes-de-Haute-Provence. He learned his trade in the Atelier Clerissy, then set up his own works in Marseille in 1710. His family controlled this factory until 1789.

After running the faience factory of Madeleine Heraud and Lois Leroy from 1710 to 1728, Joseph Fauchier created his own company in 1730 which became one of the largest factories in the first half of the eighteenth century. This pottery was situated on the Place Pentagon. He brought his nephew to Marseille, also called Joseph Fauchier, who headed the company from 1751 until his death in 1789, when the latter's son Joseph-Francois took over until the factory was finally closed in 1795. Several talented artists worked for the master including Joseph Viry and Jean Rome, the latter being a ceramicist from Montpellier. A street in Marseilles is named after Joseph Fauchier.

== Products ==
Fauchier started to make statues, and specialized in faience decorated with flowers in natural arrangements. At the beginning of the production the work used decorations "à la Berain." Rouen-style pieces were produced. Subsequently garlands or wreaths of foliage surrounding landscapes were used. The factory produced polychrome landscape of the "Moustiers" style and parts in the "Chinese" style.

The Musée de la Faïence de Marseille has a collection of work by Joseph Fauchier.

== Gallery ==
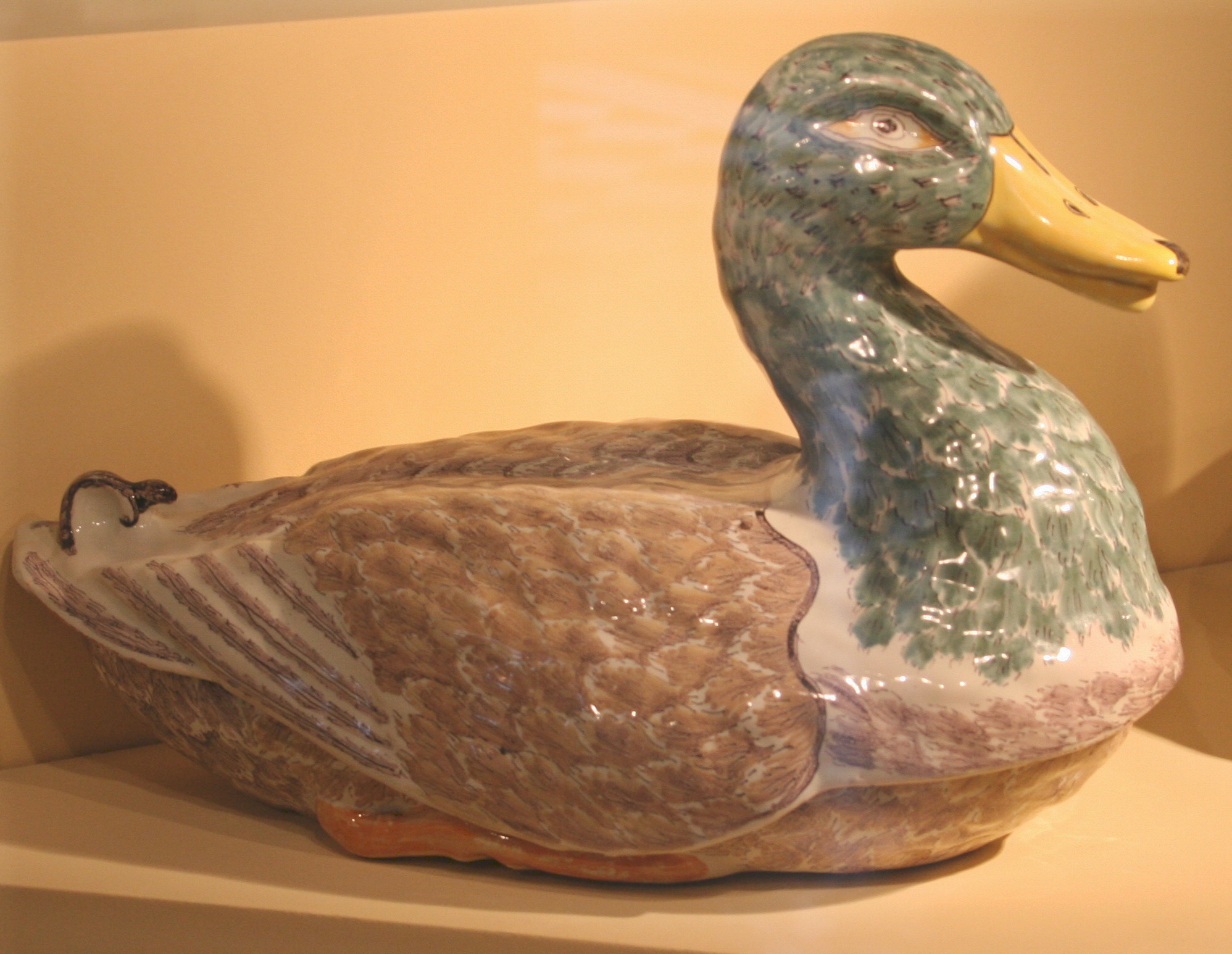
Terrine in the form of a duck

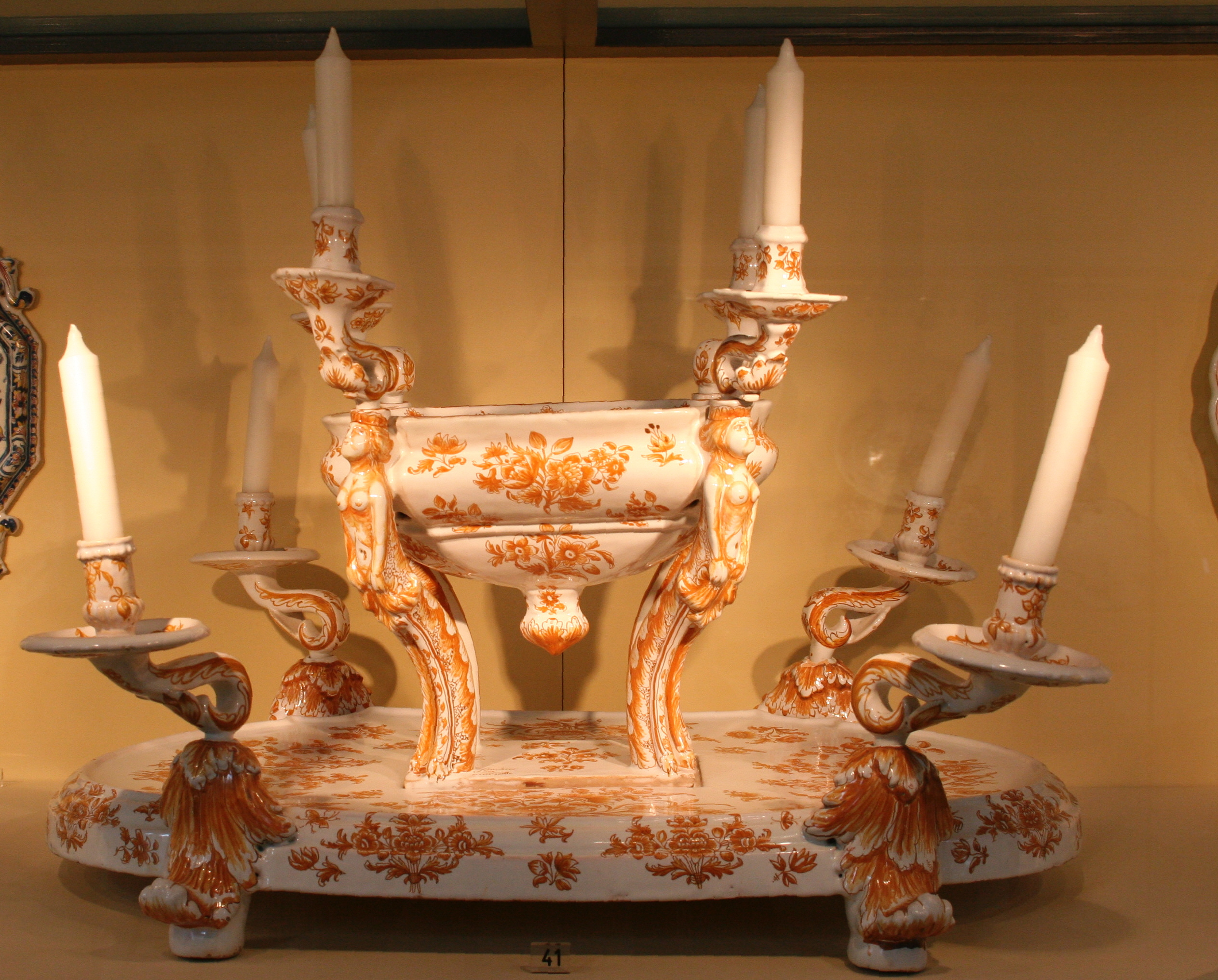
Surtout de table

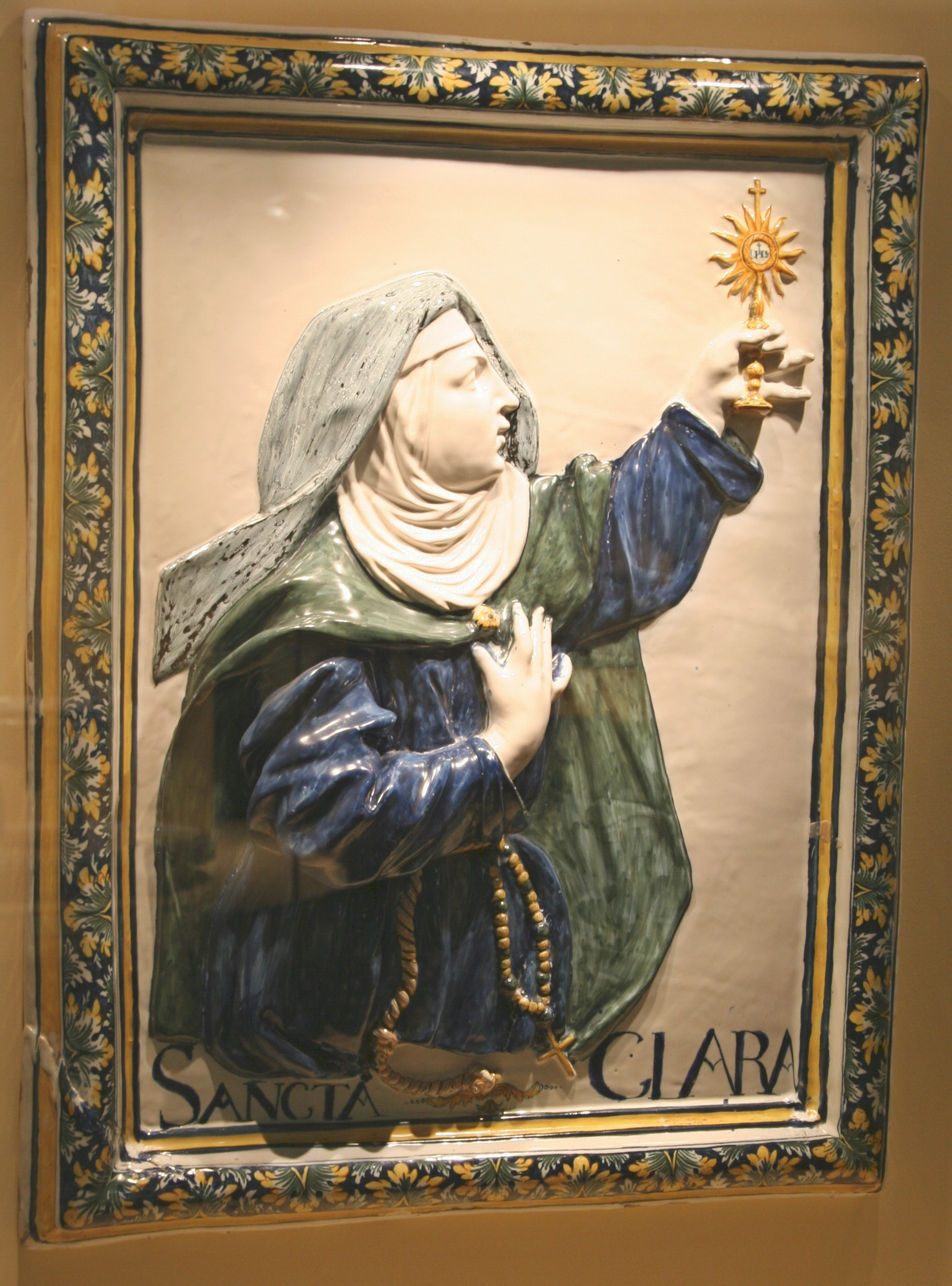
Sainte Claire

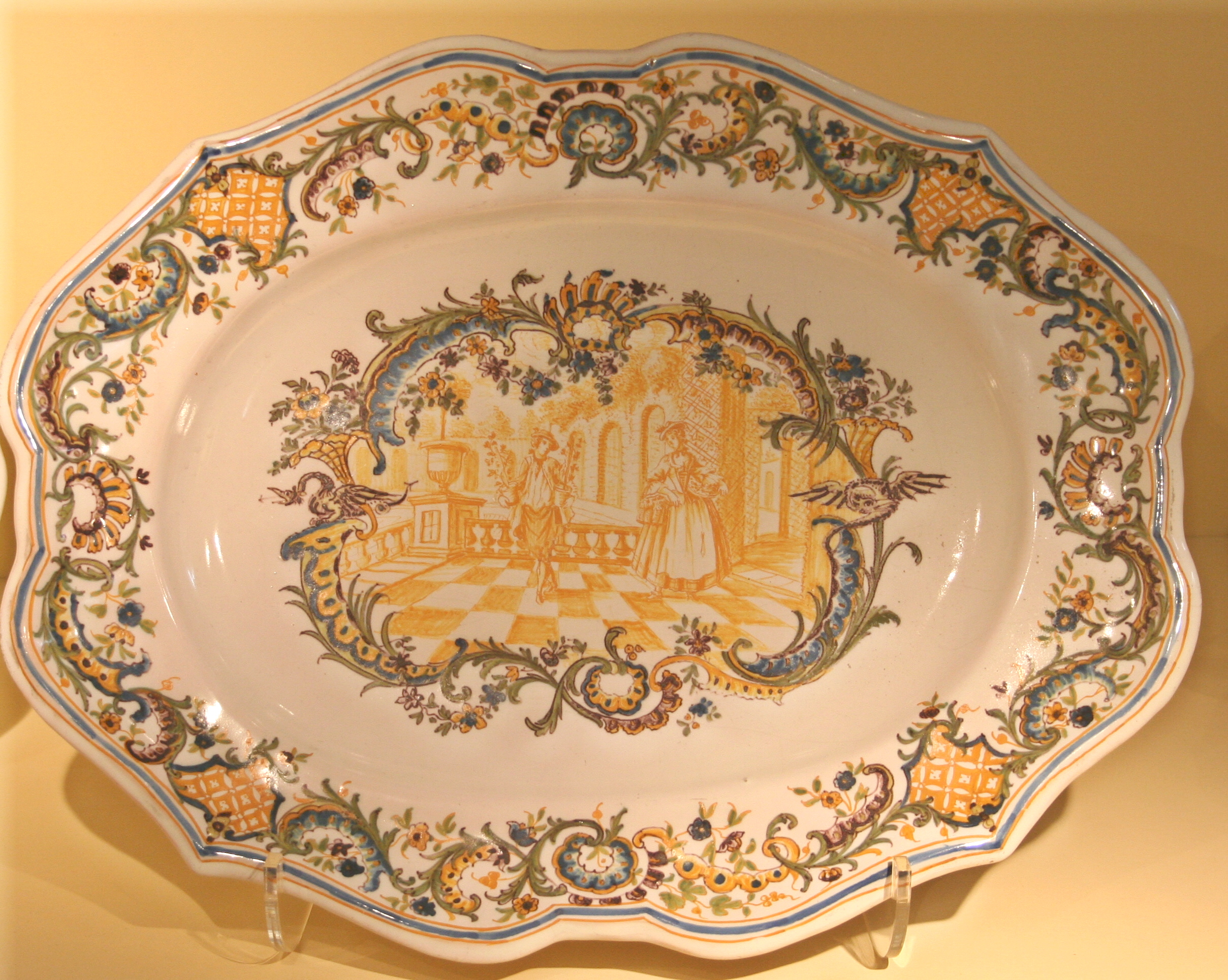
Oblong plate

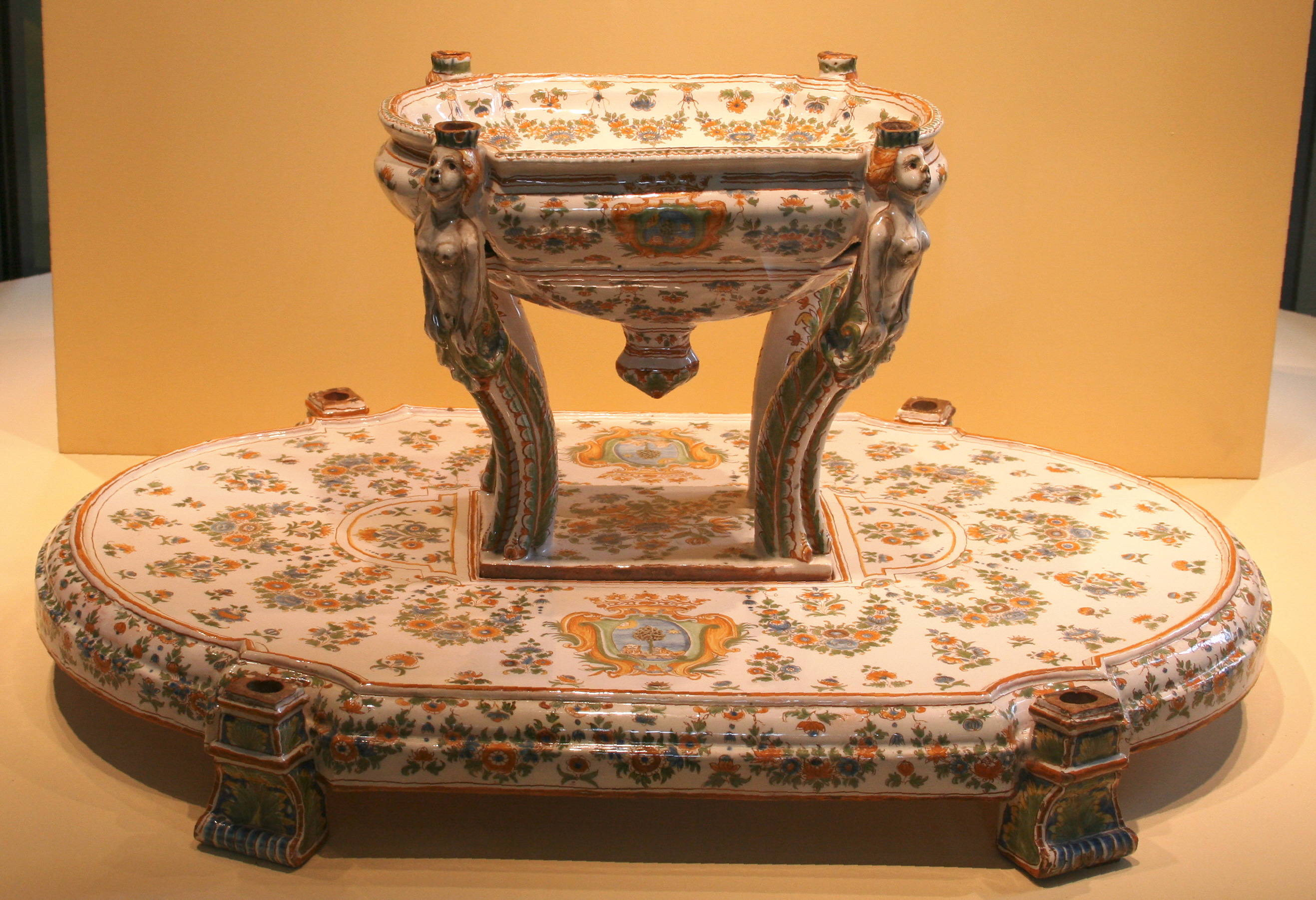
Table stand

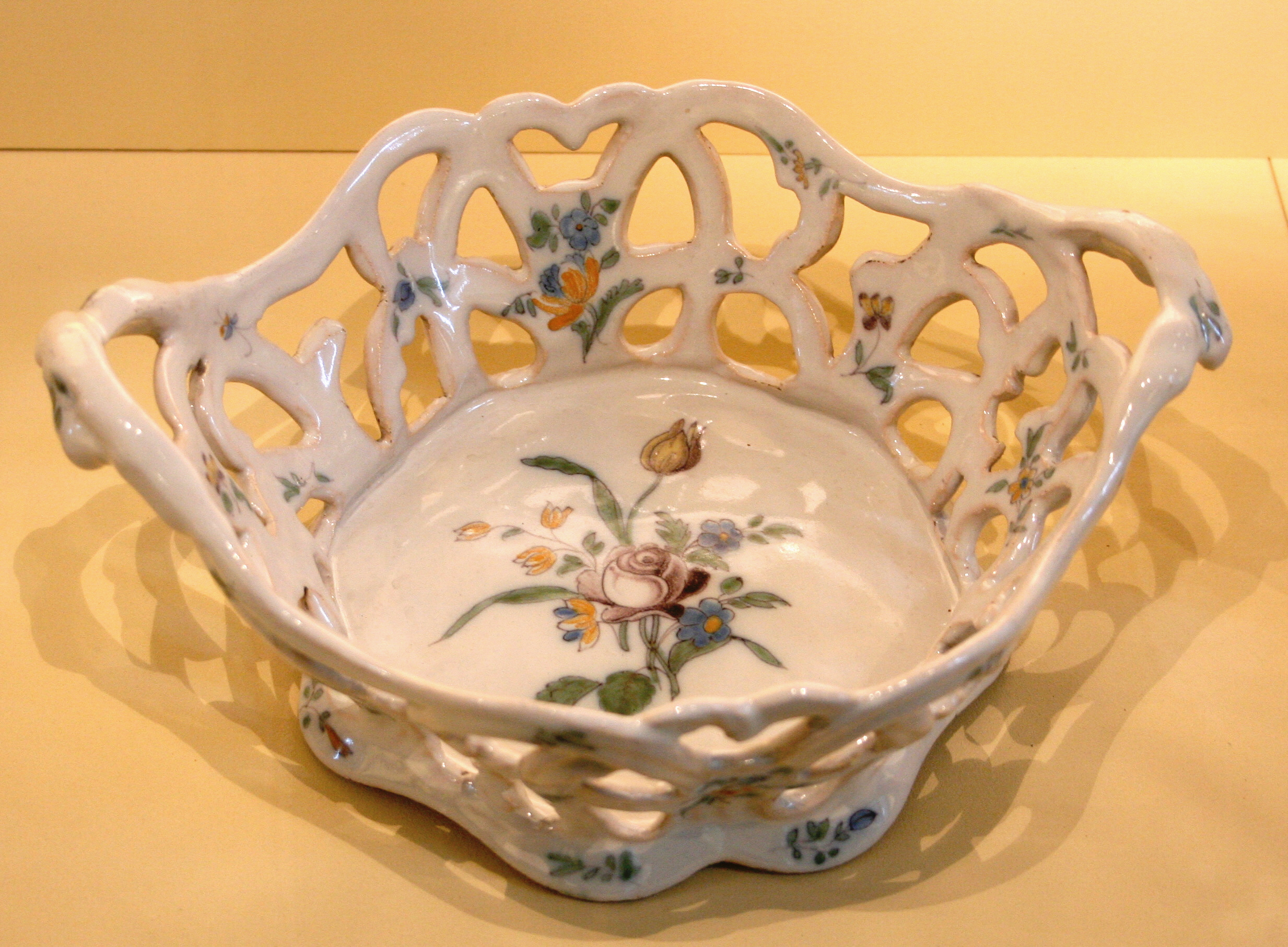
Openwork basket with flowers

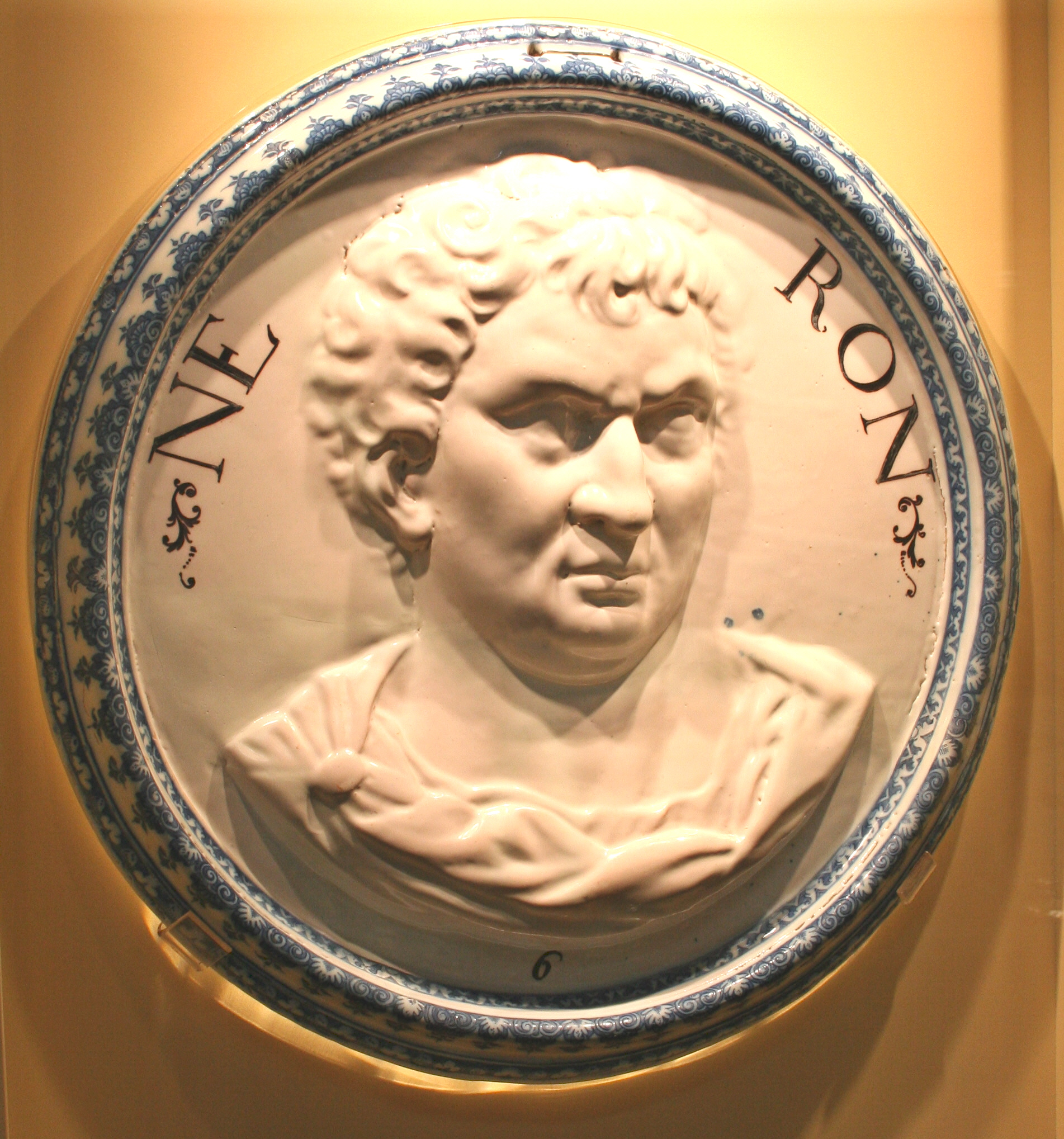
Plaque of the Emperor Nero

== Sources ==
- Campbell, Gordon (2006-11-09). The Grove Encyclopedia of Decorative Arts: Two-volume Set: Two-volume Set. Oxford University Press. ISBN 978-0-19-518948-3.
