= PZH =

PZH may refer to:

- IATA code for Zhob Airport
- Plateelbakkerij Zuid-Holland, a pottery maker in Regina (pottery)
- Narodowy Instytut Zdrowia Publicznego – Państwowy Zakład Higieny, a research institute in Poland
- Ukrainian abbreviation for the organisation Povernys Zhyvym (Ukrainian: Повернись Живим), written as ПЖ in Ukrainian
