= Boerenbont =

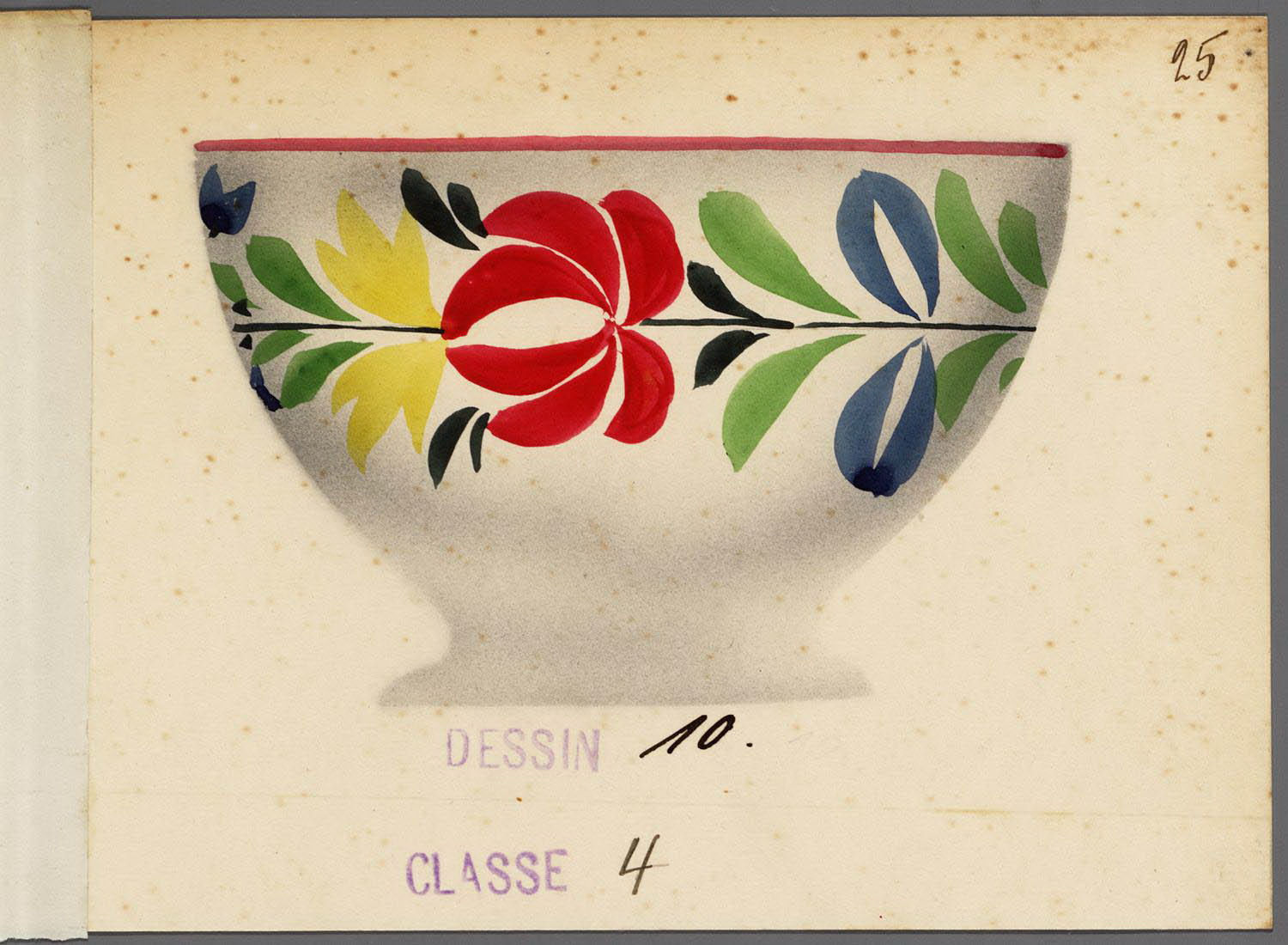
A bowl decorated with the Boerenbont motive, a popular design of Royal Sphinx potteries in Maastricht (Collection of Sociaal Historisch Centrum)

Boerenbont is a traditional pattern used on pottery from the Netherlands. Translated from Dutch, "Boer" means farmer and "bont" refers to a mixture of colors. The distinctive floral pattern is hand-painted with simple brush strokes of red, yellow, green, and blue. Currently manufactured by Royal Boch in Belgium, the pattern originated as a local craft made by farmers’ wives in the 19th century. According to the Royal Boch website, a variety of patterns have followed the path of Dutch merchants all over the world, from Sumatra to Zanzibar via Goa. It remains a popular pattern today.

== See also ==
- Delftware
- Gouda (pottery)
