= Ephraim Faience Pottery =

American art pottery company

- Type: Private
- Industry: ceramic arts
- Founded: 1996
- Headquarters: Lake Mills, Wisconsin, United States
- Products: art pottery
- Owner: Kevin Hicks
- Website: https://www.ephraimpottery.com

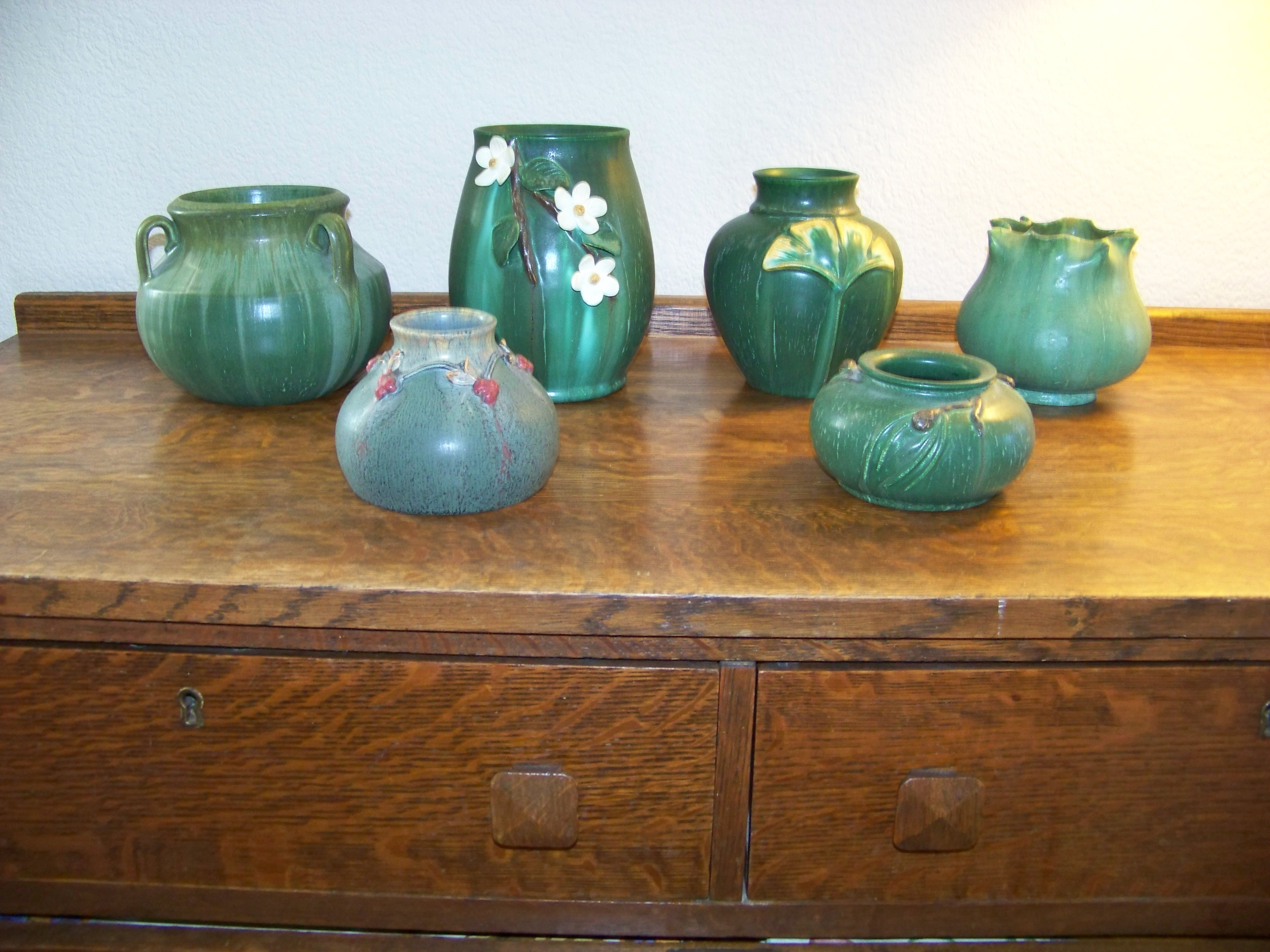
A privately owned collection of pieces made by Ephraim Faience Pottery.

Ephraim Faience Pottery is an American art pottery company founded in 1996 in Deerfield, Wisconsin, United States by Kevin Hicks and two partners who have since left the company. It is now located in Lake Mills, Wisconsin. The company produces art pottery in the tradition of the Arts and Crafts Movement with matte glazes over sculpted earthenware in editions of no more than 500 pieces. It produces primarily vases, as well as bowls, lidded boxes, candleholders, pitchers and lanterns. In the past, it has also produced tiles and sculpted paperweights. A prototypical Ephraim Faience piece is a vase finished in a matte green background color, and embellished with sculpted decorative representations of plant or animal life. The company also produces pieces in other colors and in non-representational designs. In 2009, the company employed eight artisans.

The magazine Arts and Crafts Homes and the Revival commented "Ephraim Faience, which relies on familiar naturalistic (and often Japanesque) motifs like dragonflies, gingko leaves, and water lilies, reports that new designs by their artisans sell better than strict reproductions."

The name "Ephraim" was adopted from the village of Ephraim in Door County, Wisconsin.

== Marks ==
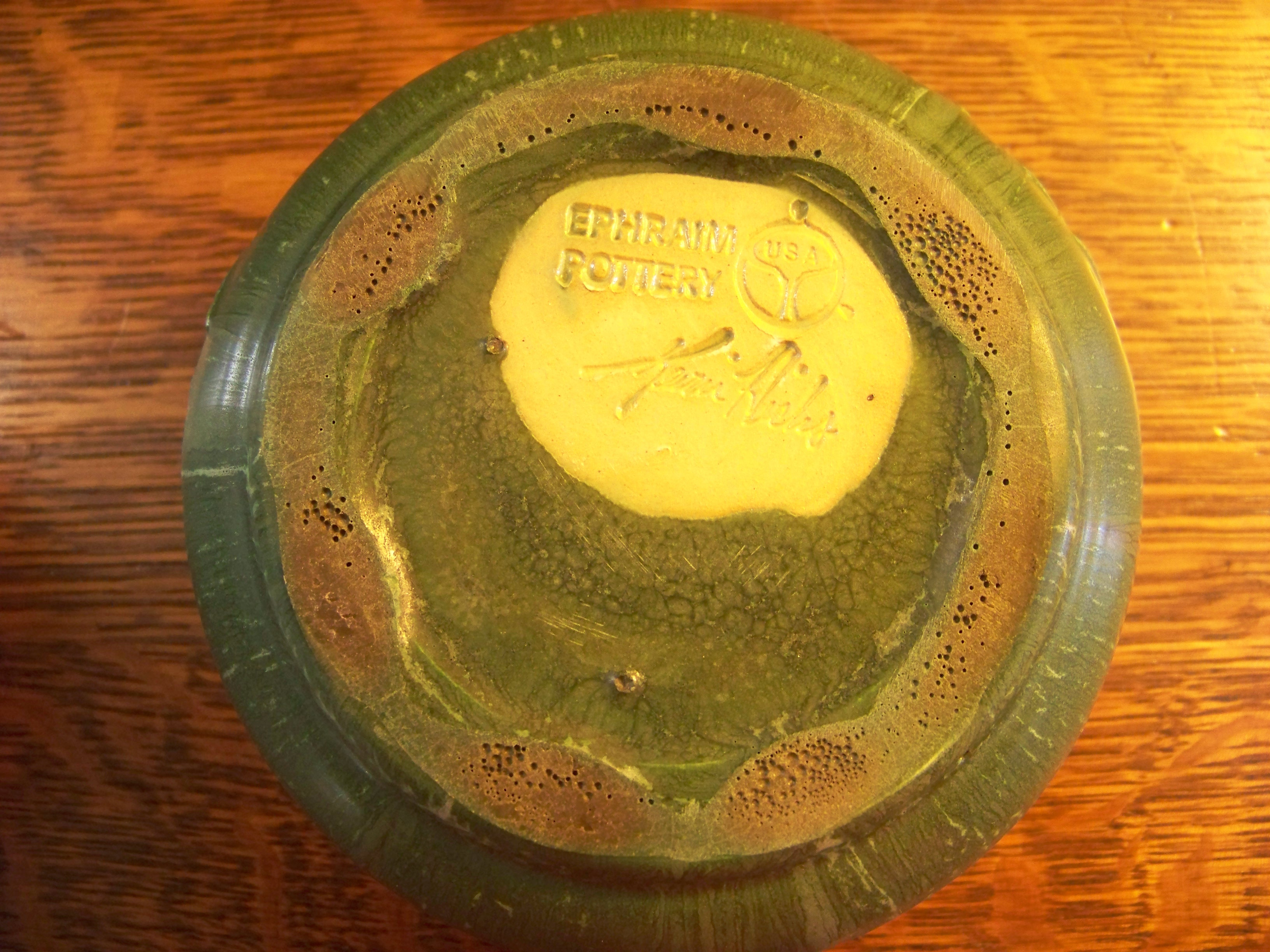
The mark on the underside of a piece made by Ephraim Faience Pottery founder, Kevin Hicks.

Each piece is individually marked with a date code, the company logo and an artist signature stamp. Additional stamps indicate whether it is an experimental piece, made during an anniversary year (5th and 10th anniversaries are both marked) or part of a special edition.

== See also ==
- List of pottery terms
- Arts and Crafts movement
- Ceramic
- Ceramics (art)
- Earthenware
- Faience
- Teco pottery
