= Clérissy faience factories =

Clérissy family faience factories produced Moustiers pottery until 1733

Ateliers Clérissy
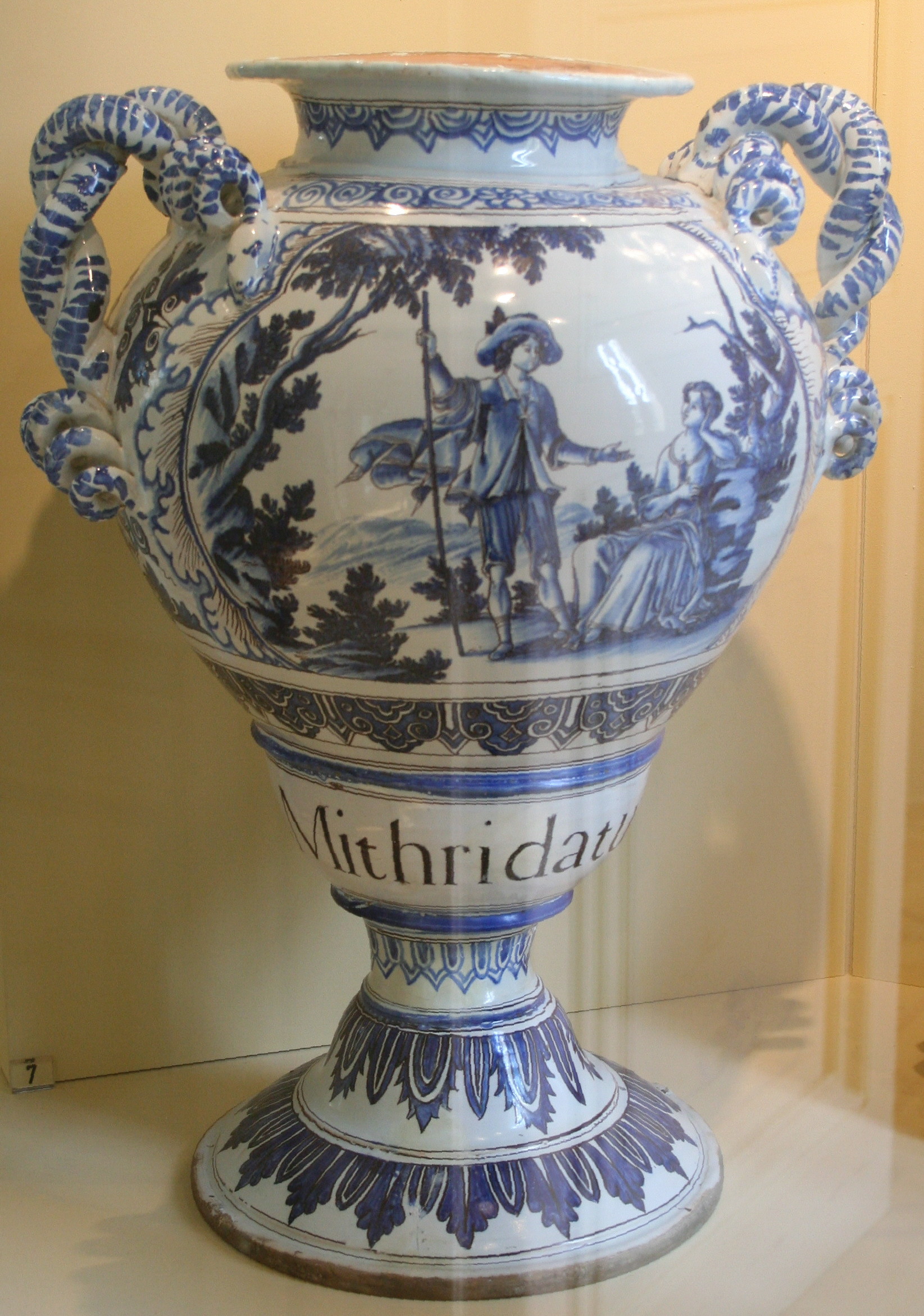
- Pharmacy vase
- Founded: 1677
- Founder: Pierre and Joseph Clérissy
- Defunct: 1733
- Headquarters: Marseille, France
- Products: Faïence

The Clérissy faience factories or ateliers Clérissy were the main pottery factories making Moustiers faience, operated by members of the Clérissy family in Moustiers-Sainte-Marie in the Alpes-de-Haute-Provence, in Marseille, France, and later Varages and elsewhere. Family members continued to produce faïence in different locations until 1733. The first factory was founded by Joseph Clérissy in Marseille around 1677, followed by his brother Pierre Clérissy in Moustiers around 1679.

== Moustiers ==
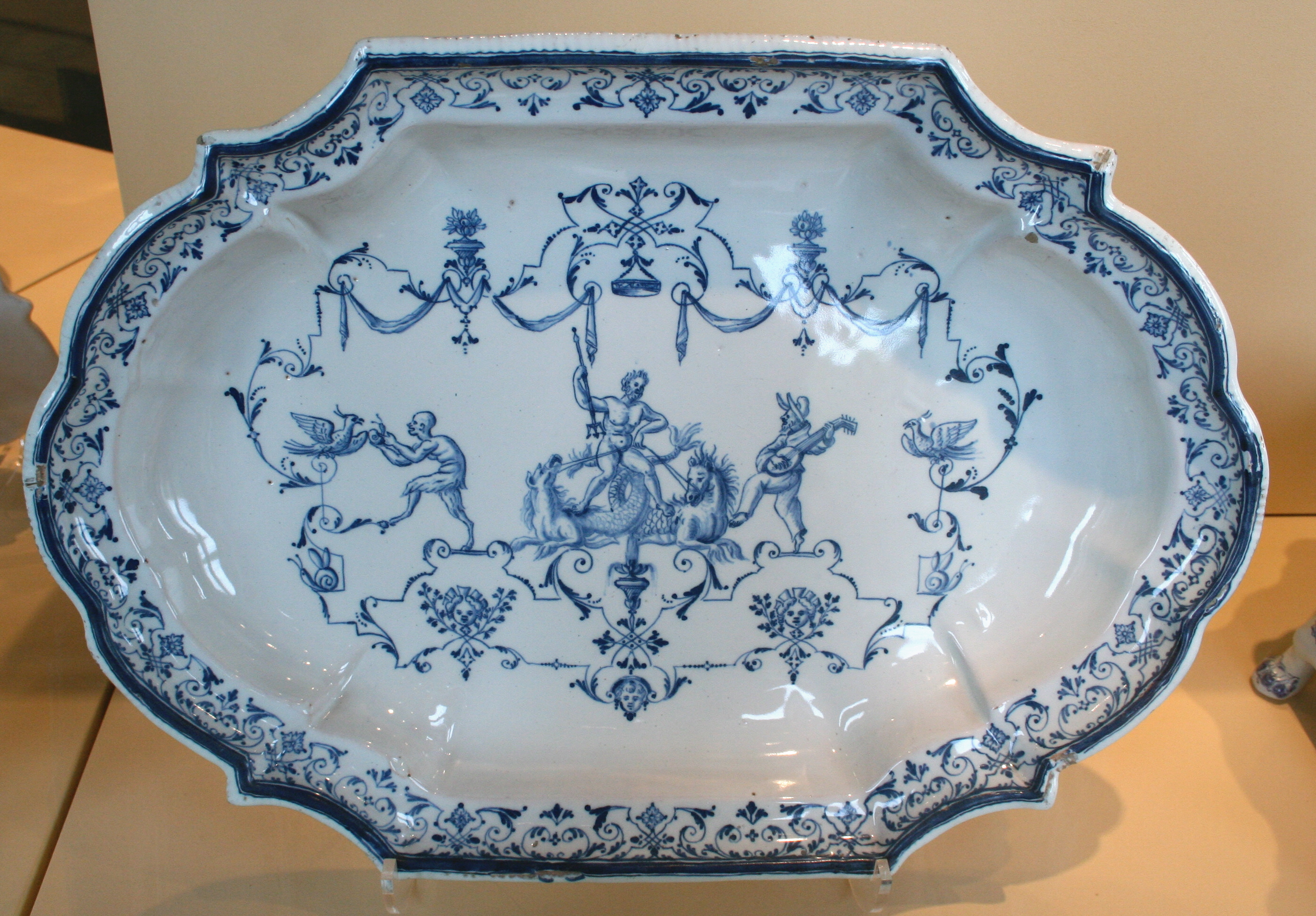
Oblong plate with blue grand feu decoration. (Moustiers) Bérain style decoration (around 1720-1730). Musée de Sèvres.

Faience, the French term for tin-glazed pottery, takes its name from Faenza, Italy, which became a center of manufacture and export in the fifteenth and sixteenth centuries. The first faïence works in Moustiers was founded around 1679 by Pierre Clérissy (born around 1651), who came from a long line of local potters. From 1702 he was assisted by his son Antoine. Until 1715, Pierre and Antoine Clérissy were the only family making faïence in Moustiers. The painters and decorators François, Gaspard and Jean-Baptiste Viry, father and sons, worked in their factory.

Between 1679 and around 1730 the Clérissy factory in Moustiers produced high quality work in monochrome cobalt blue on a white background. The styles included the Louis XIV style, where large game dishes had decorations on mythological or religious themes, decorations inspired by the work of Jean Bérain the Elder, introduced to Moustiers about 1710, and a series with floral decorations and patterned borders. The styles were sober and simple, suitable for the tables of rich and distinguished people.

Many of the plates painted by Gaspard Viry are signed, often depicting scenes of the chase after engravings by Antonio Tempesta. In some, Tempesta's drawings are faithfully reproduced, but in other Viry has added his own details. Jean-Baptiste Viry also copied Tempesta, but with a distinctly different style. A pair of vases produced by Pierre Clerissy depict scenes from Greek mythology, accurately reproducing prints by Frans Floris.

== Marseilles ==
Joseph Clerissy, Pierre's brother, founded the first faience factory in the Marseilles region around 1677, in Saint-Jean-du-Désert. His family managed the factory until 1733. At his death, the factory management was undertaken from 1688 to 1697 by François Viry who had married the widow of the deceased potter, Anne Roux. Direction was assumed by Antoine Clérissy, son of Joseph, from 1697 to 1722. At that time, Antoine Clérissy rented a factory in the plain of Saint-Michel, then established himself Joliette, Marseille where he continued his work until 1732. Antoine Clerissy died in 1748.

At first the factory produced Baroque-style wares decorated mostly in blue with manganese outlines. Some designs were based on those of Simon Vouet (1589–1649) and Nicolas Poussin (1594–1665). Others included picturesque scenes and chinoiseries. The products of this workshop are characterized by sober colors. The decorations are inspired by scenes of historical, mythological, religious or romantic character.

== Varages ==
On 23 November 1695 Joseph and Honoré Clerissy, nephews of Pierre Clerissy of Moustiers, established themselves in Varages, about midway between Moustiers and Marseille. Some years later their brother Jean-Baptiste left Moustiers to join the brothers in Varages. The factory prospered, producing well-regarded products. The factory at Varages made faience in all the same styles as Moustiers, including blue paintings from Italian prints, and the Berain, Boulle and Torro designs. Varages also made polychrome grotesques in the Pompadour style or in imitation Chinese style, using the strong colors common to Marseille. As other potters came to Varages, in the last three quarters of the eighteenth century it came to rival Moustiers.

== Gallery ==
The Musée de la Faïence de Marseille has an important collection of work from the Clérissy factory in Marseille, with some pieces from Moustiers.

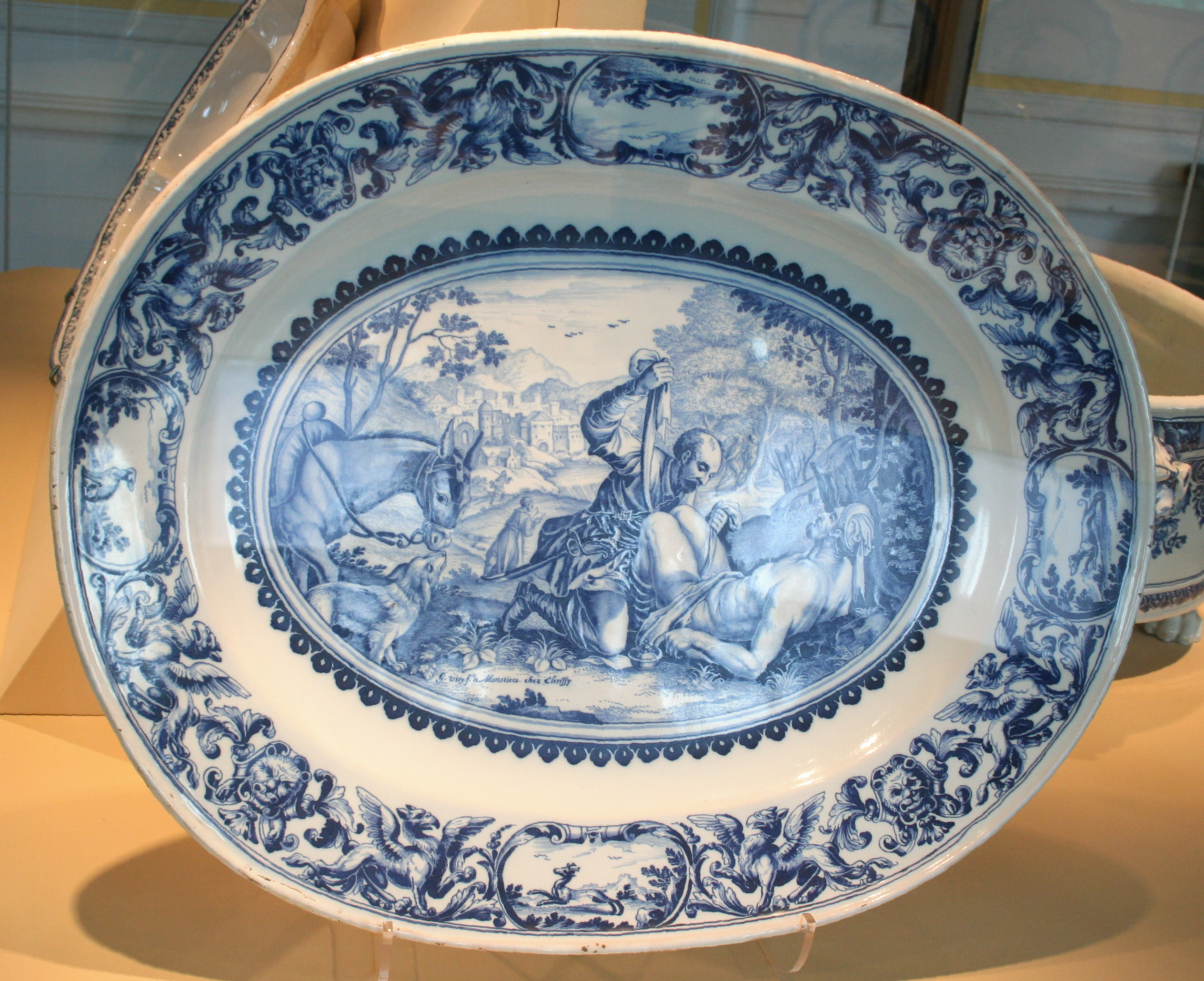
Plate with blue grand feu decoration: The Good Samaritan (Moustiers) painted by Gaspard Viry (1711)

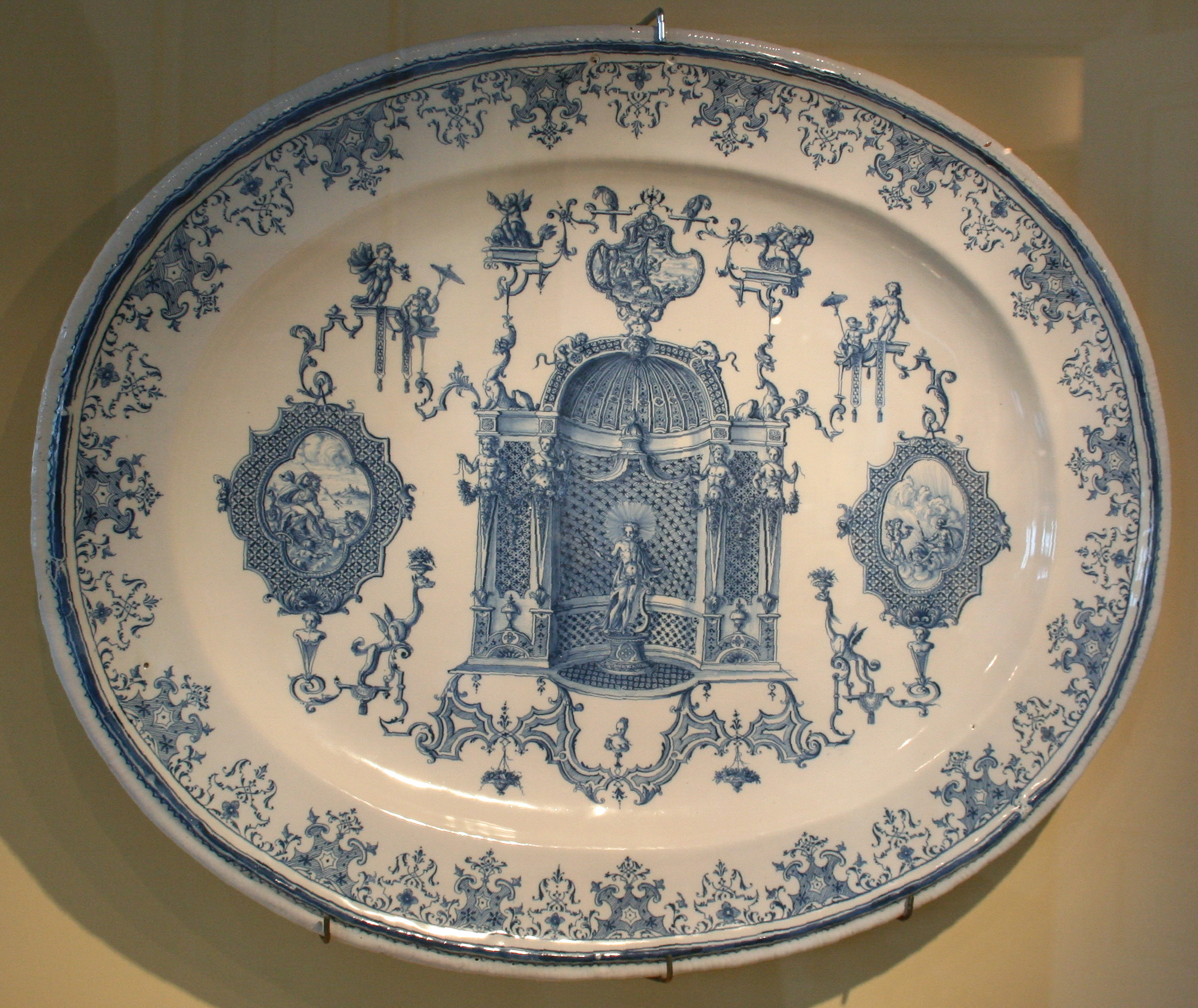
Oblong plate with blue grand feu decoration (Moustiers)

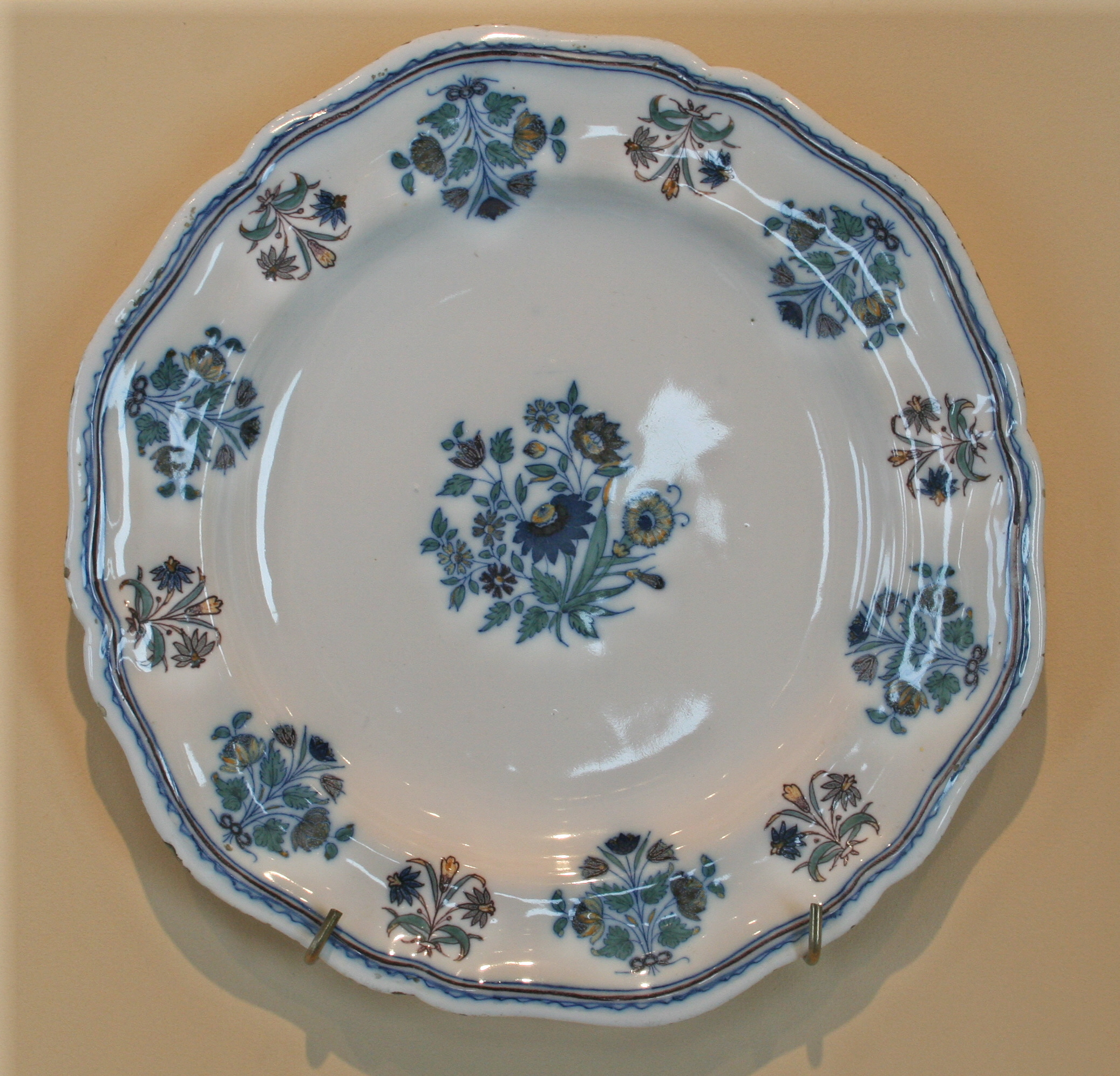
Plate with grand feu decorations

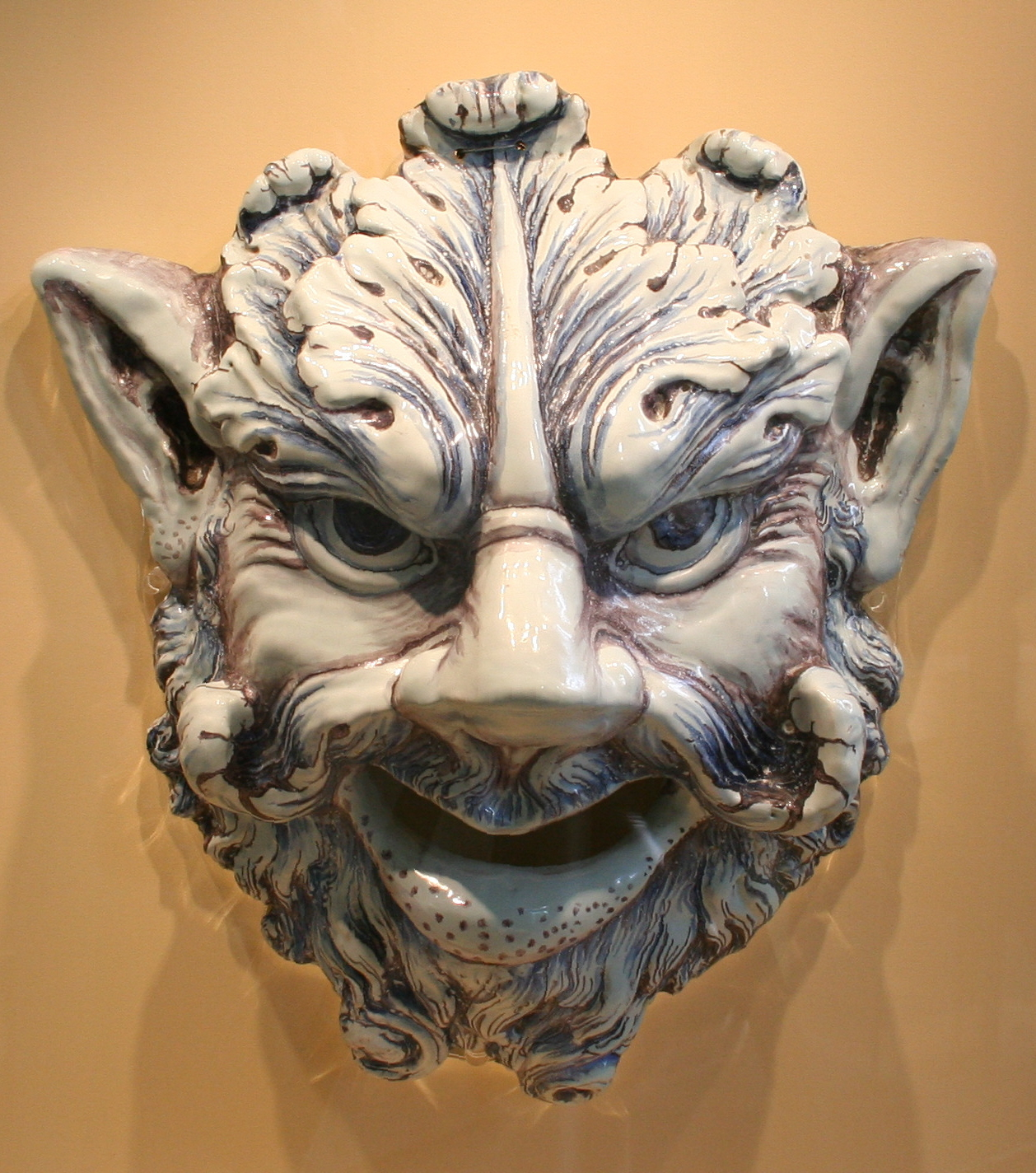
Mascaron

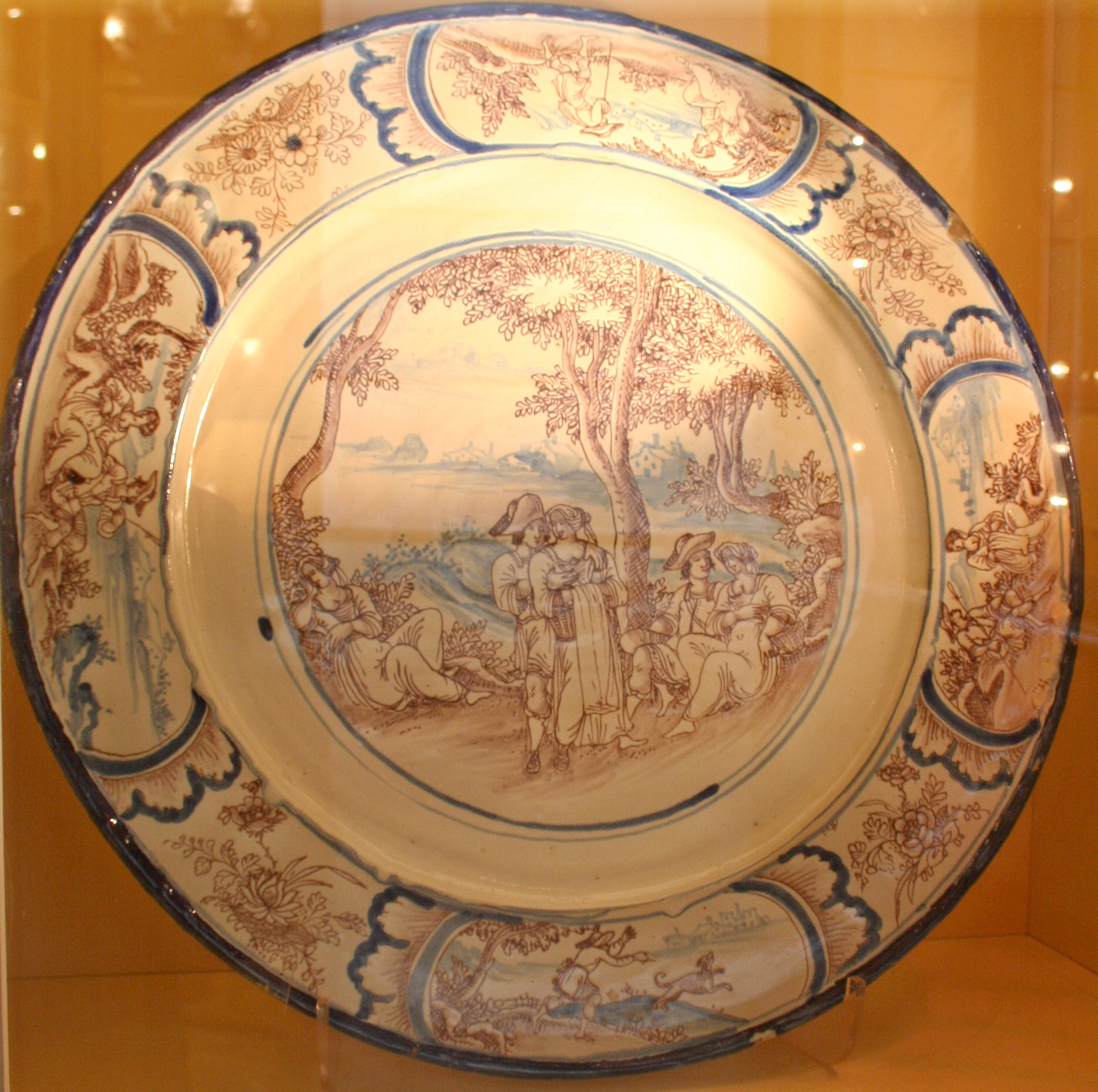
Round plate from the Clérissy factory at Saint Jean du désert

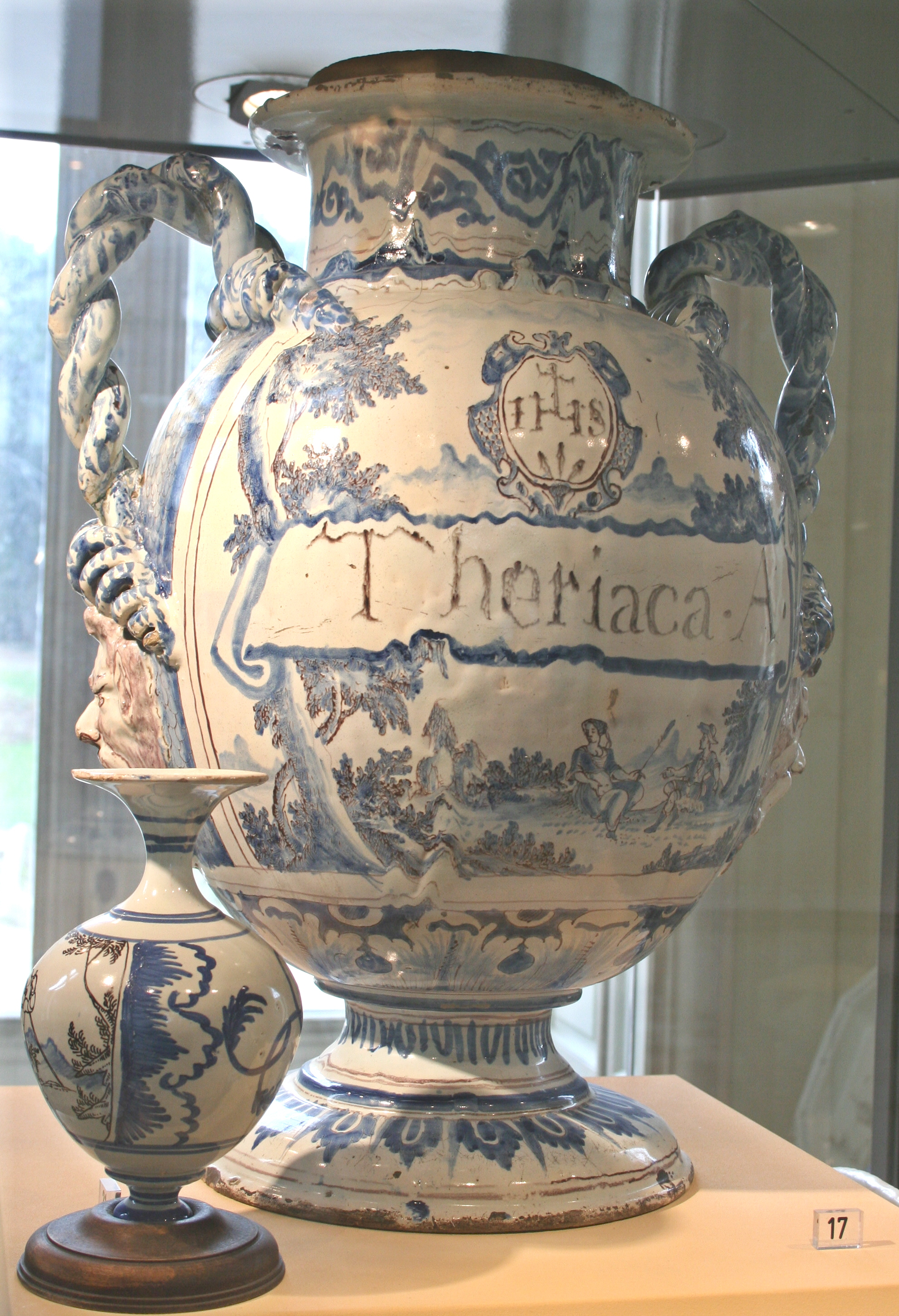
Pharmacy vase from the Clérissy factory at Saint Jean du désert
