= Herrebøe Faience Factory =

Ceramics factory in Norway

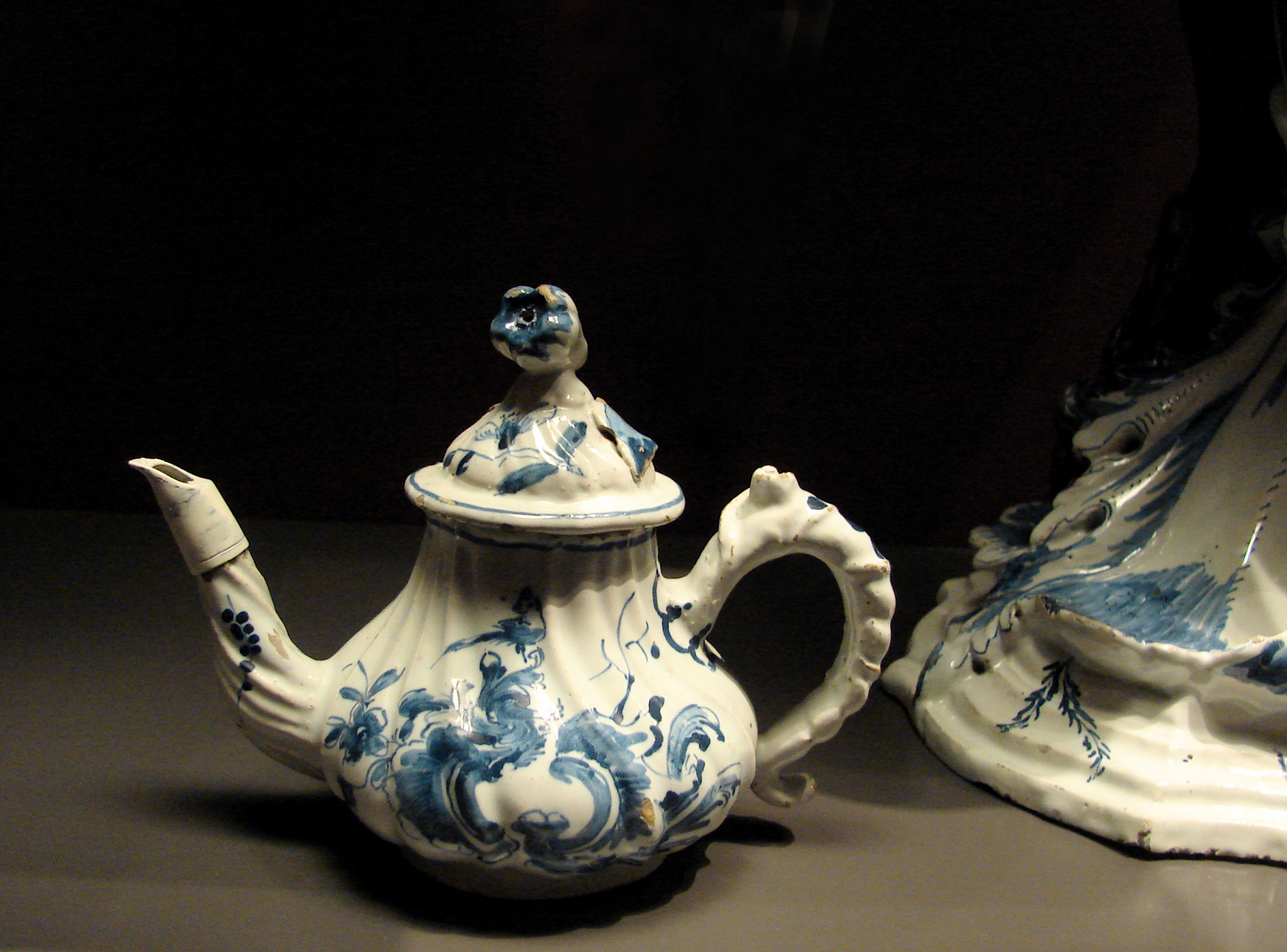
Porcelain teapot from Herrebøefabrikken

Herrebøe faience factory (Herrebøefabrikken) was a faience manufacture located in Idd, (now Halden), Norway.

== History ==
Herrebøe was founded in 1759 by Peter Hofnagel (1721–1781) as a continuation of a brickwork, pottery and cocklestove factory. It was in operation for approximately 20 years. Bad economic conditions and competition led to the end of production shortly after 1770. The production consisted principally of tea and coffee sets, punch bowls, plates and dishes, candlesticks and flower vases. Examples of Herrebøe faience are still preserved with the main public collection at the Norwegian Museum of Decorative Arts and Design (Kunstindustrimuseet) in Oslo. Items from Herrebøe faience are also on display at the Borgarsyssel Museum in Sarpsborg.

== Other sources ==
- Opstad, Lauritz (1992) Boken om Herrebøe fajansene (Oslo : C. Huitfeldt Forlag) ISBN 8270031135
