= Regina (pottery) =

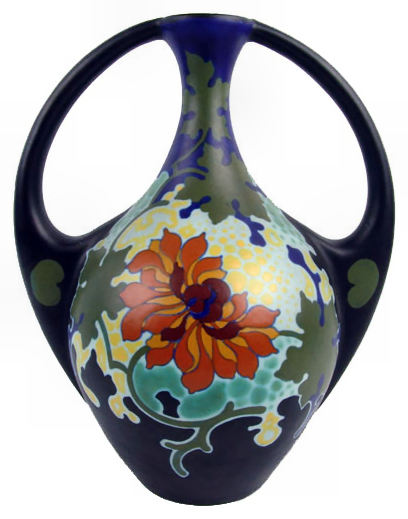
A vase in the "Chryso" pattern, circa 1925, manufactured by Kunstaardewerkfabriek Regina of Gouda, Holland.

The Regina pottery factory, Kunstaardewerkfabriek Regina, existed from 1898 to 1979. Located in Gouda, Holland, the factory was established in Queen Wilhelmina's coronation year 1898, hence the name Regina, Latin for "queen." Initially, the company made earthenware tobacco pipes, like almost all Gouda pottery factories.

== History ==
The factory was founded by Gerrit Frederik van der Want, a descendant of the Gouda pottery family Van der Want, and Georges Antoine Alexis Barras, a Belgian lender and art collector. Their initials WB are also on almost all products. Regina started with the production of art pottery in 1917, because the company was able to buy a number of (pottery) molds from the bankrupt Rozenburg pottery factory, which made high-quality pottery in the period from 1883 to 1917.

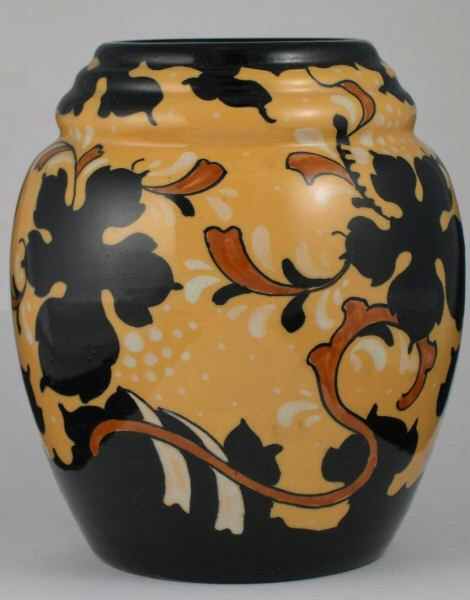
Regina vase

The biggest competitor of Regina in the field of decorative and colored pottery was the Plateelbakkerij Zuid-Holland (PZH). In the beginning, Regina produced the shiny plateel pottery, but it soon became clear that the general public preferred the new matt veneered plate. PZH was, for the time being, an unmatched competitor in this field. In its heyday Regina produced for large foreign retailers, including in England (Liberty of London) and in Canada (Ryrie Birks).

Deteriorating company results, a poor economy, and the bad health of Otto van der Want (son of the founder), made him decide to close the earthenware factory in 1979. The name was sold to Artihove, which produced Regina-palette until 1993.

The productive period of Regina can be divided into the following periods, each with their own type of pottery:

- 1898 - 1917 tobacco pipes
- 1917 - 1930 plateel with shiny finish
- 1920 - 1930 plateel with matte finish
- 1932 - 1937 crisis pottery
- 1935 - 1979 Dutch Delftware
- 1935 - 1950 Floral motifs and continuation of older success motifs
- 1950 - 1970 modern designs

During and after the Second World War, Regina tried unsuccessfully to produce dinner services. Floris Meydam's designs such as the mint green coffee, tea and dinner service are examples of this. The plateel factory was located at the Oosthaven in Gouda.

Museum Gouda (formerly known as Museum De Moriaan), has a collection of Regina pottery.
