= Gouda (pottery) =

Style of Dutch pottery named after the city of Gouda

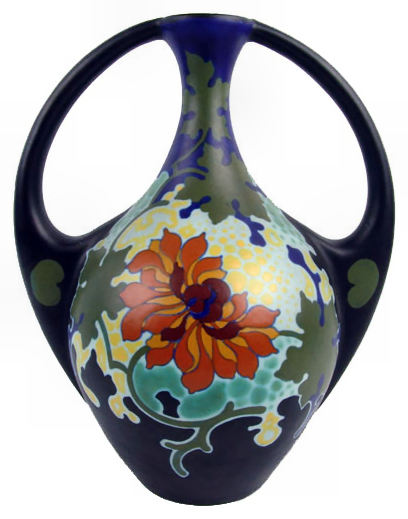
A vase in the "Chryso" pattern, circa 1925, manufactured by Kunstaardewerkfabriek Regina of Gouda, Holland.

Gouda is a style of Dutch pottery named after the city of Gouda, where it was historically manufactured. Gouda pottery gained worldwide prominence in the early 20th century and remains highly desirable to collectors today.

Gouda pottery is diverse and visually distinctive in appearance, typically illustrated with colourful and highly decorated Art Nouveau or Art Deco designs.
