= Castellaneta Marina =

Town in Italy

- Frazione
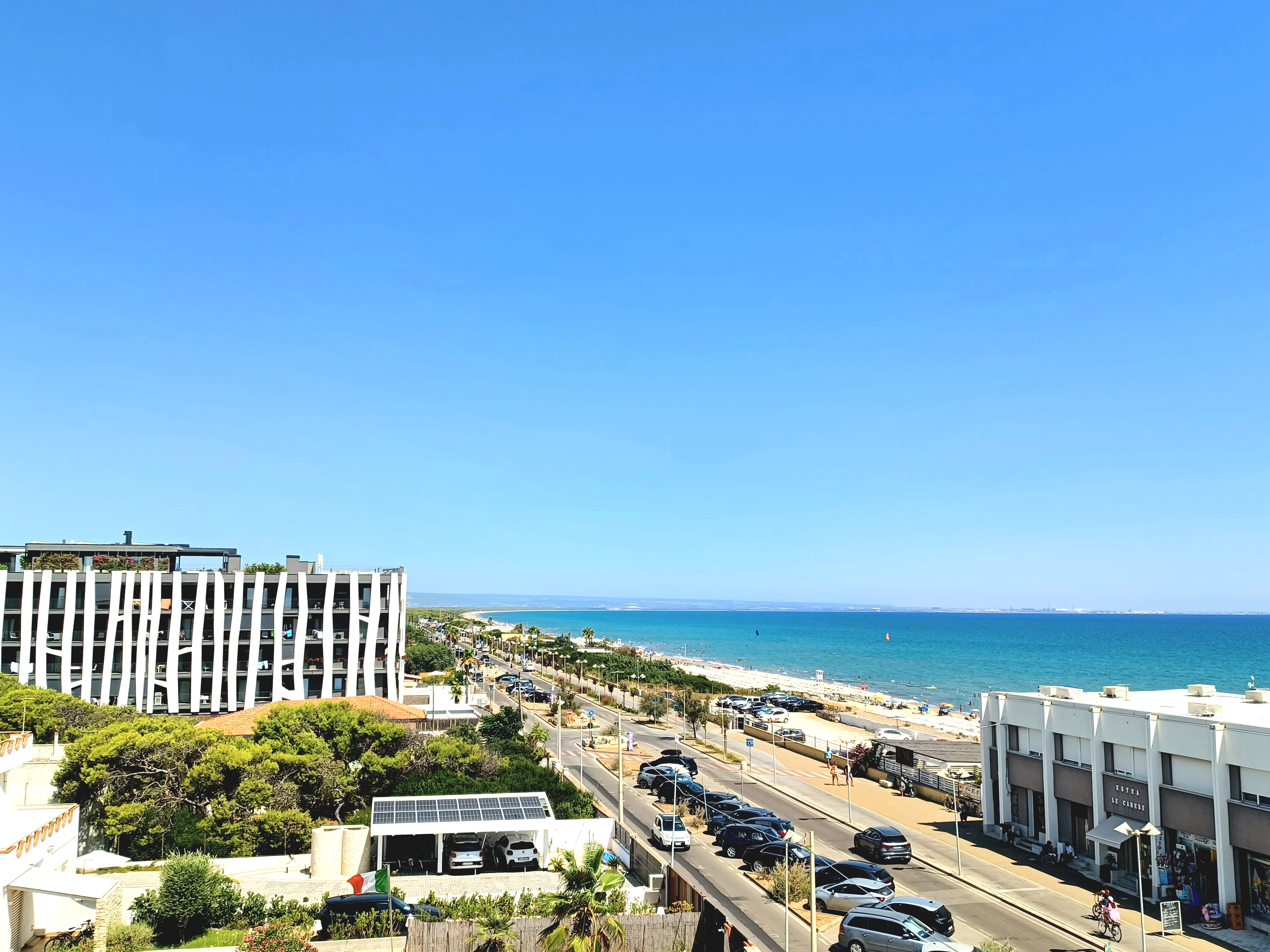
- Elevated view of the promenade facing east
- Interactive map of Castellaneta Marina
- Location in Italy and Apulia Castellaneta Marina (Apulia) Castellaneta Marina (Province of Taranto)
- Country: Italy
- Region: Apulia
- Province: Taranto
- Comune: Castellaneta

Area
  - Total: 10 km^{2} (3.9 sq mi)
- Elevation: 5 m (16 ft)

Population (2025)
  - Total: 814
  - Density: 81/km^{2} (210/sq mi)
- Time zone: UTC+1 (CET)
  - Summer (DST): UTC+2 (CEST)
- Postal code: 74011
- Patron saint: Stella Maris
- Saint day: 15 August
- Province of Taranto Comune of Castellaneta

Castellaneta Marina is a coastal town in Apulia, Italy. Administratively, it's classified as a frazione of Castellaneta, a comune in the Province of Taranto.

Composed almost exclusively of residential villas, it serves primarily as a seasonal tourist destination, characterized by vast sandy beaches, coastal pine forests, hotels and holiday villages.

== Geography ==
Located approximately 18 km southwest of its municipality, the township itself covers roughly 3 km of Ionian coastline, extending to 9 km if surrounding localities and wildlife territories are included. The settlement is in fact entirely built within the Bosco Pineto pine forest (the same 9 km of shoreline), which reaches more than one kilometre inland in some areas. This forest is part of the larger Stornara State Nature Reserve, that stretches over 20 km along the Ionian Coast of Taranto, from the regional border (SW) to the mouth of the Patemisco river (NE). Bosco Pineto represents the dense coastal forest of Aleppo pines that the reserve has protected since 1977. The northeastern boundary of Castellaneta Marina's wider natural territory is marked by the Lato river and its estuary with the Ionian Sea. The coastal landscape includes fossil dunes of geological and environmental significance and thick maquis shrubland.

== History ==
The settlement developed in the 1960s as a planned seaside resort following land reclamation work in the area, which was previously marshland due to the encroachment of coastal dunes. The incumbent mayor Gabriele Semeraro, along with other public officials, lead a significant boost in its development, contributing to public urbanization works as well as the establishment of a summer camp and the first beach resorts. The settlement's street names reflect the Space Race ongoing during the time period, either commemorating American and Soviet astronauts or referring to lunar features, spacecraft and space missions. It is the only town in the world whose street toponymy consists almost exclusively of astronautical names.

On July 10, 2019, an extraordinary atmospheric event for the area, a supercell, caused widespread damage and disruption across the entire Ionian coast. Because of its particular geography, Castellaneta Marina ended up being one of the most dangerous places to be in and was among the areas most severely affected. The violent downbursts of wind gusts exceeding 100 km/h felled hundreds of Aleppo pine trees, becoming an additional safety hazard and causing further damage to homes, vehicles, and power lines. Immediately after the storm, various regional authorities were mobilized to assist with the clearance as the priority was removing dangerous fallen trees and making the area safe. In the following months, reforestation initiatives were launched to begin restoring the damaged forest. The Municipality of Castellaneta and ARIF Puglia distributed Aleppo pine saplings to residents, encouraging them to help replace the trees lost during the downburst.

== Urban layout and public spaces ==
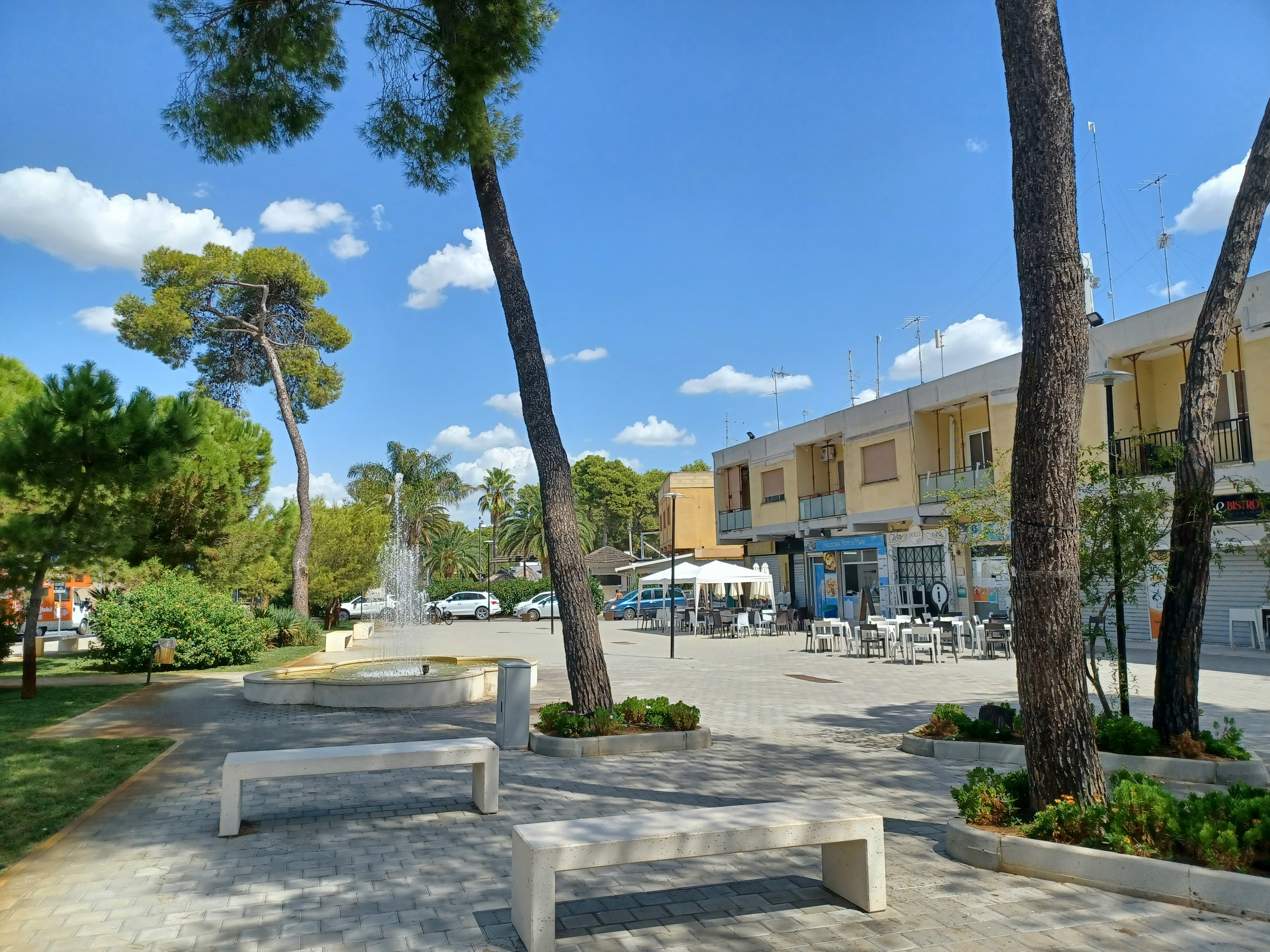
Piazza Kennedy, in the center of town

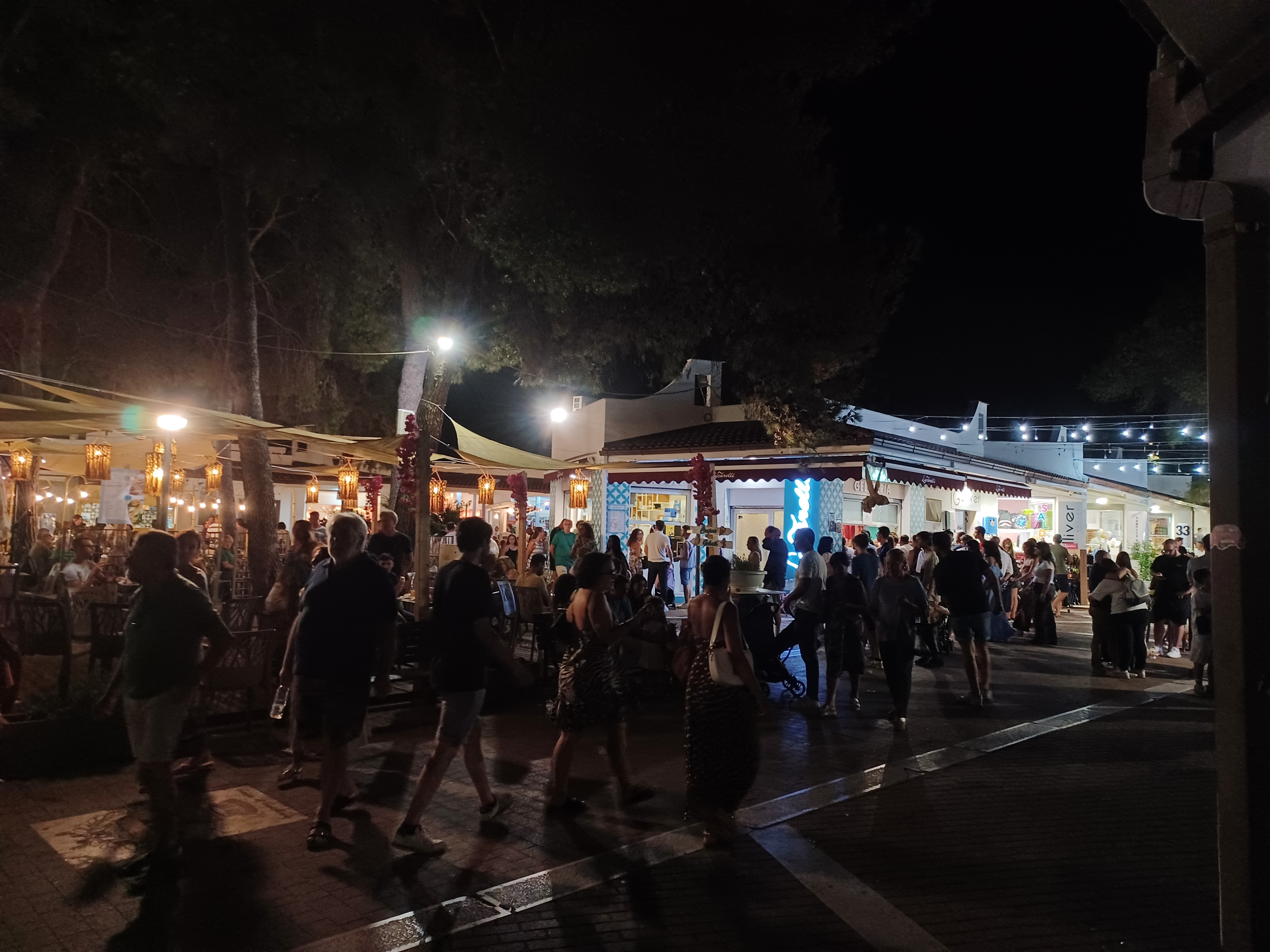
Piazza Selene on a lively summer night

The urban center is organized around two main streets: Viale dei Pini and Lungomare degli Eroi del Mare, a 2.5 km seafront promenade lined with beach resorts, public beaches, bars, restaurants and nightclubs. The commercial and nightlife center is Piazza Selene, while the adjacent Piazza Kennedy serves primarily administrative and public service functions; It is home to a police station, a post office, a tourist information point, and a Guardia Medica Turistica (a seasonal service that offers non-emergency medical care to tourists and temporary visitors when their regular general practitioner is unavailable). Stella Maris Church is also located in this area, and its auditorium is the town's main multipurpose facility. It is located on the ground floor of a complex that also houses a study center and a library on the first floor. The facility, holding a maximum capacity of 140 people, serves as a multipurpose venue for theatrical and musical performances, conferences, conventions, and cultural and community events.

== Transport ==
=== Bus ===
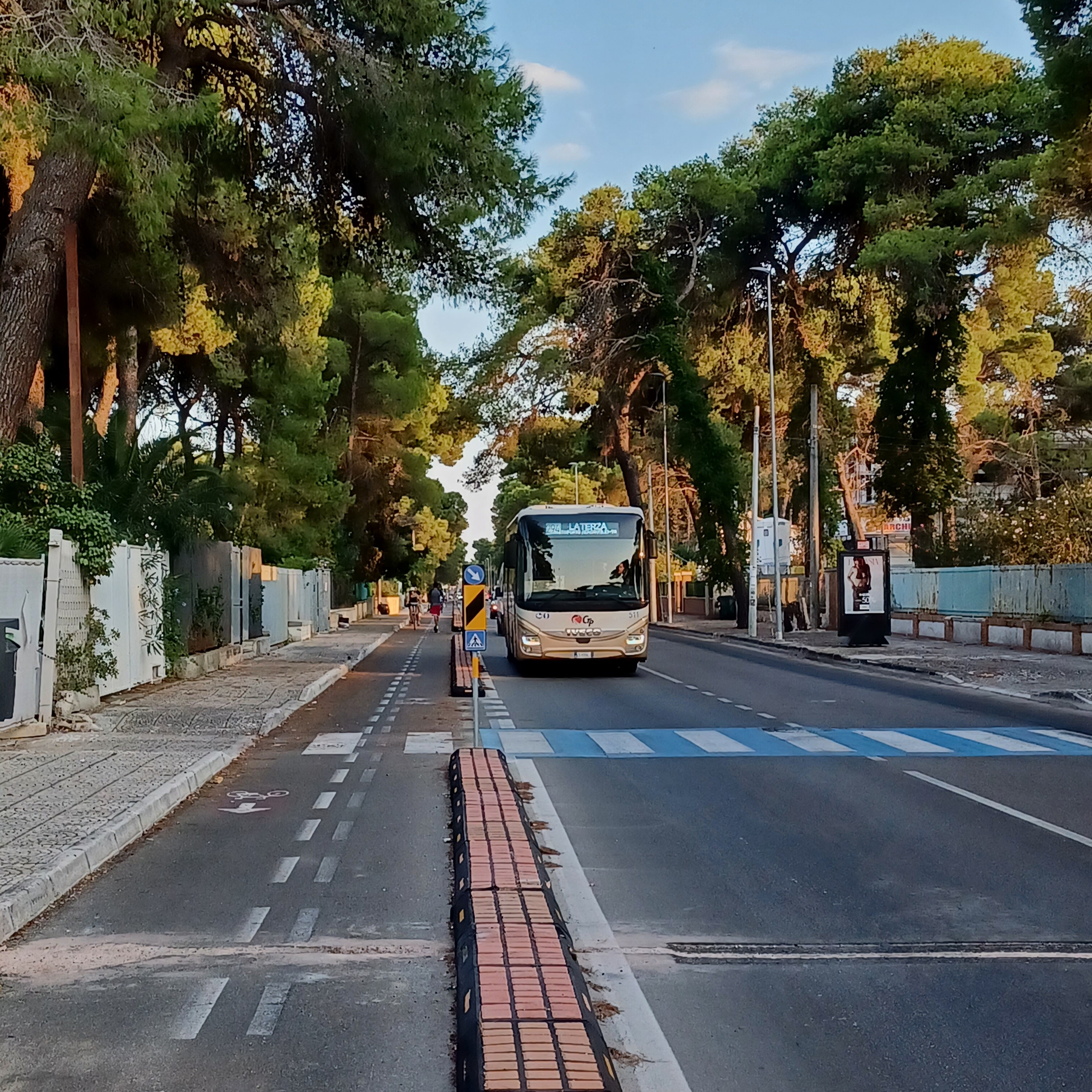
The last daily run of route 294, headed towards Taranto

The primary bus service is CTP Taranto (Public Transport Consortium), part of the Co.Tr.A.P. consortium. The main lines are route 294, which connects Castellaneta Marina to the provincial capital of Taranto (Laterza–Ginosa–Ginosa Marina–Castellaneta Marina–Taranto), and route 226, which is the regular connection between the municipality and the seaside resort (Castellaneta–Castellaneta Marina–Ginosa Marina). During the summer season, to meet increased tourist demand, seasonal routes 225, which adds Palagianello to the municipal route, and 232, dedicated to coastal connections (such as Chiatona), are also activated. Apart from its provincial connections, Castellaneta Marina is linked to Bari, the regional capital, by various Co.Tr.A.P. bus services, whose availability varies (the service operated by Gruppo Sabato Viaggi is generally the most reliable). Seasonal interregional connections are also available, such as SITA Sud's route 652-1, which connects Castellaneta Marina with Matera via Laterza, Ginosa and Ginosa Marina. Many of these services operate mainly, or exclusively, during the summer season.

=== Train ===
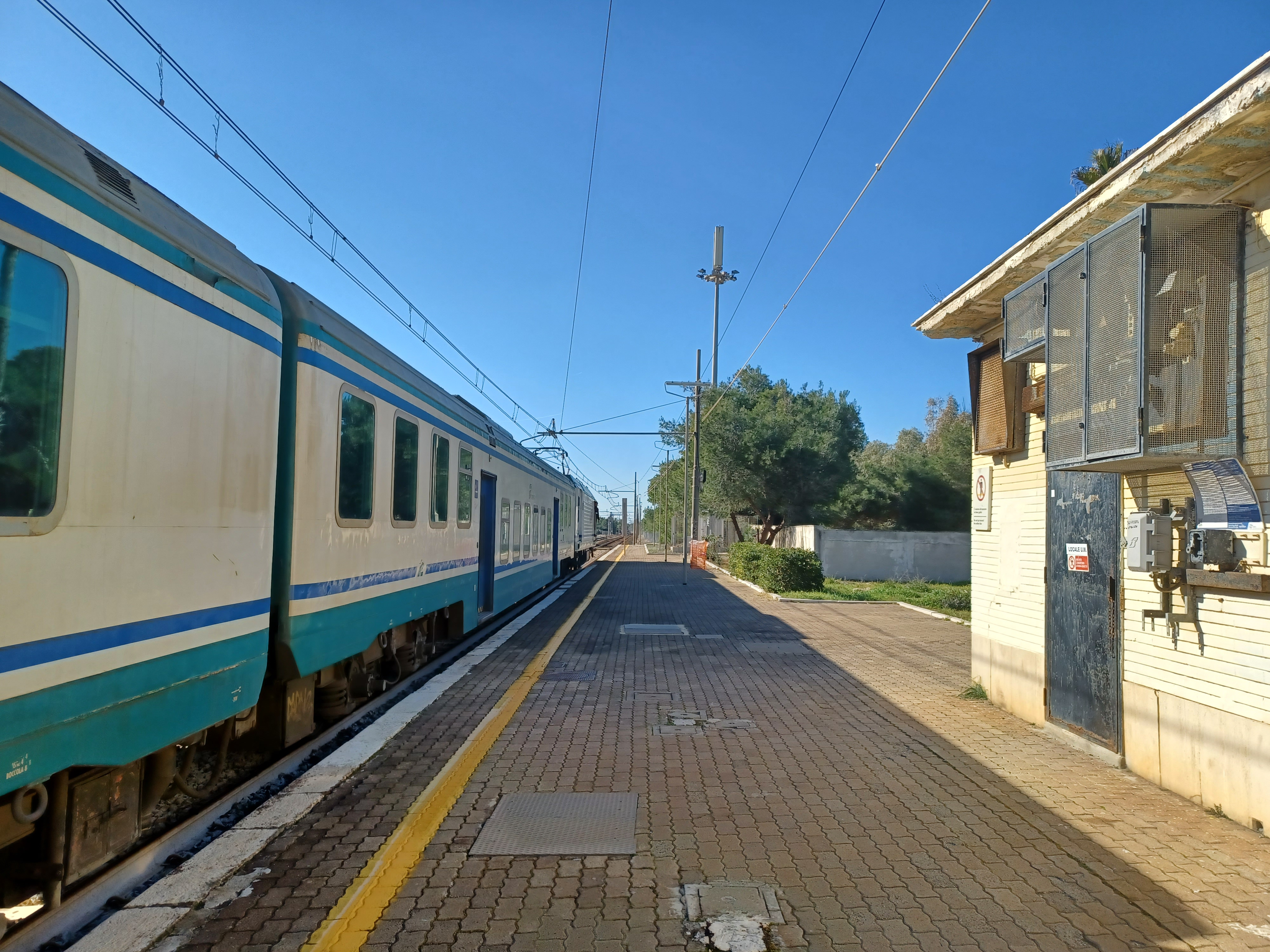
The station with a morning regional train

The village is served by the Castellaneta Marina train station, located on the Ionian Railway approximately 2.5 km from the town center as the crow flies. Like the town itself, it's completely surrounded by the coastal pine forest and shrub. The station, operated by Rete Ferroviaria Italiana (RFI), has two tracks and is used exclusively by Trenitalia's regional rail service. Two passenger trains stop at the station each day, and only one on sundays. The station directly connects Castellaneta Marina with Taranto on one side (NW) and Metaponto, Potenza, Naples, and Reggio Calabria on the other (SE). It plays an especially important role during the summer season, serving as the only rail access point to the tourist town. From the isolated station, the town can be reached by car or on foot, either along a footpath that runs parallel to the railway tracks or by following the beach. The village was once also served by the Bosco Pineto station, located on the southeastern seafront edge of the urban perimeter and later demolished in 1994.

== Gallery ==
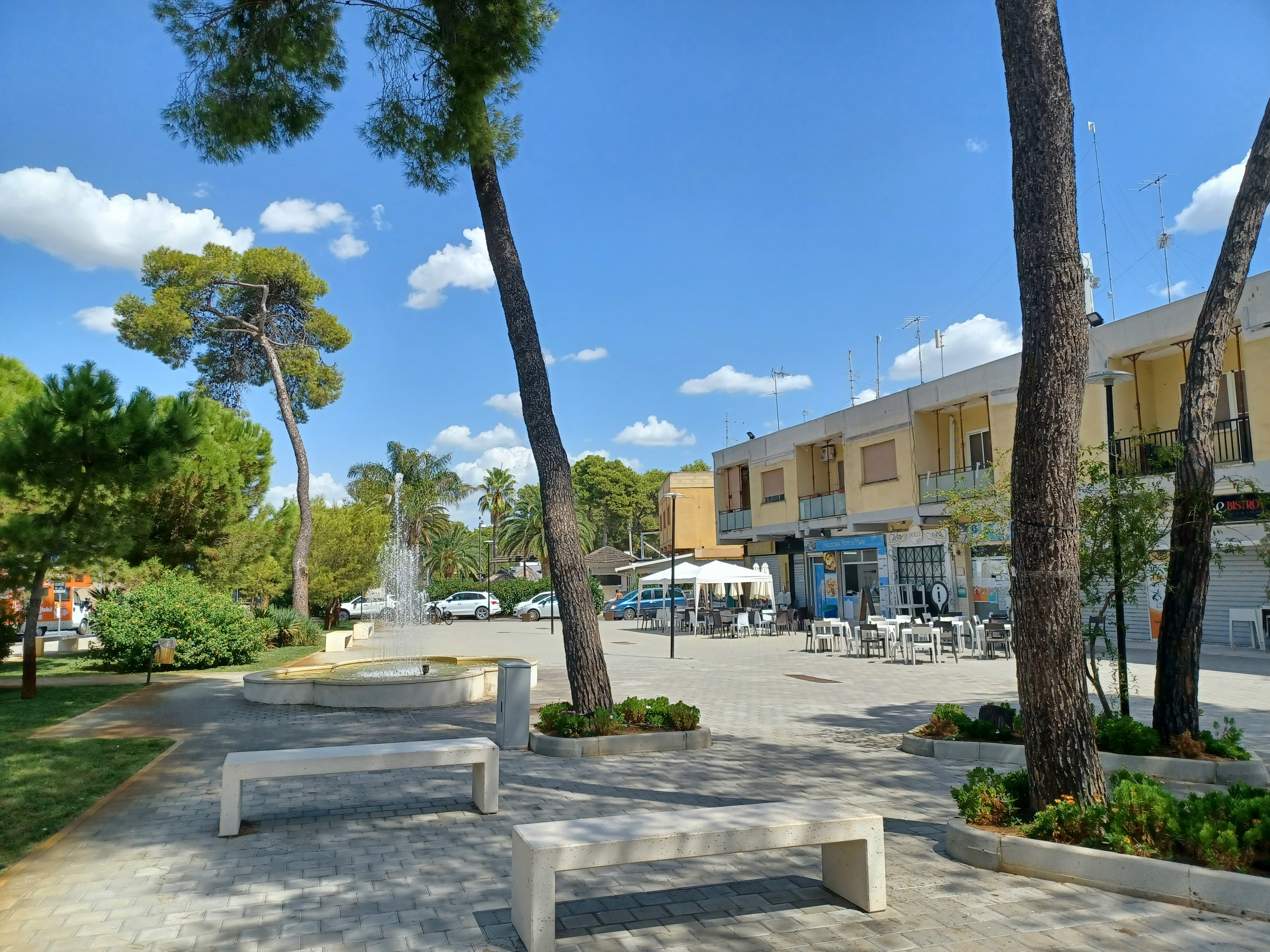
Piazza Kennedy, in the center of town, newly renovated; august 2026

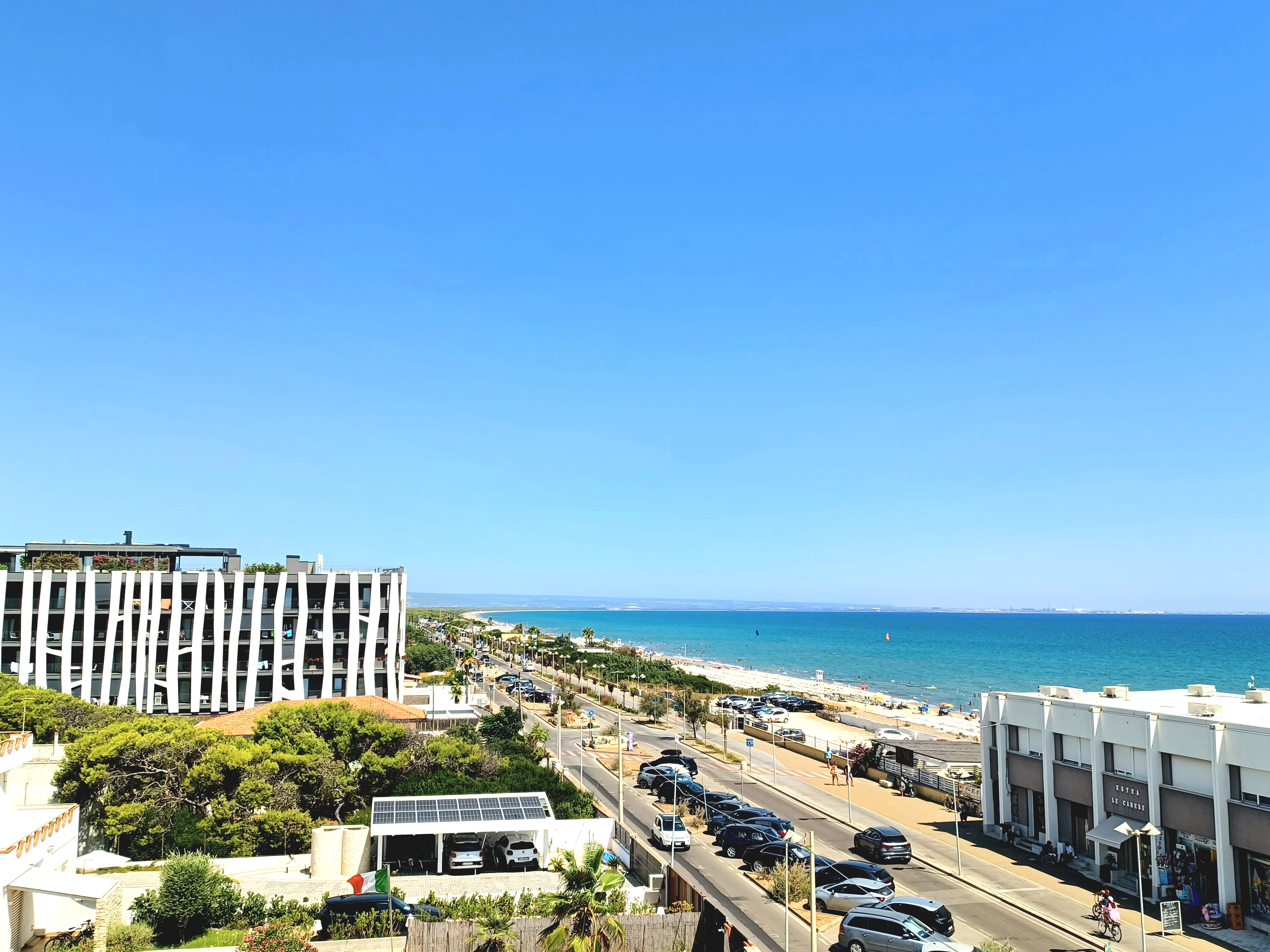
Lungomare Eroi del Mare, facing east

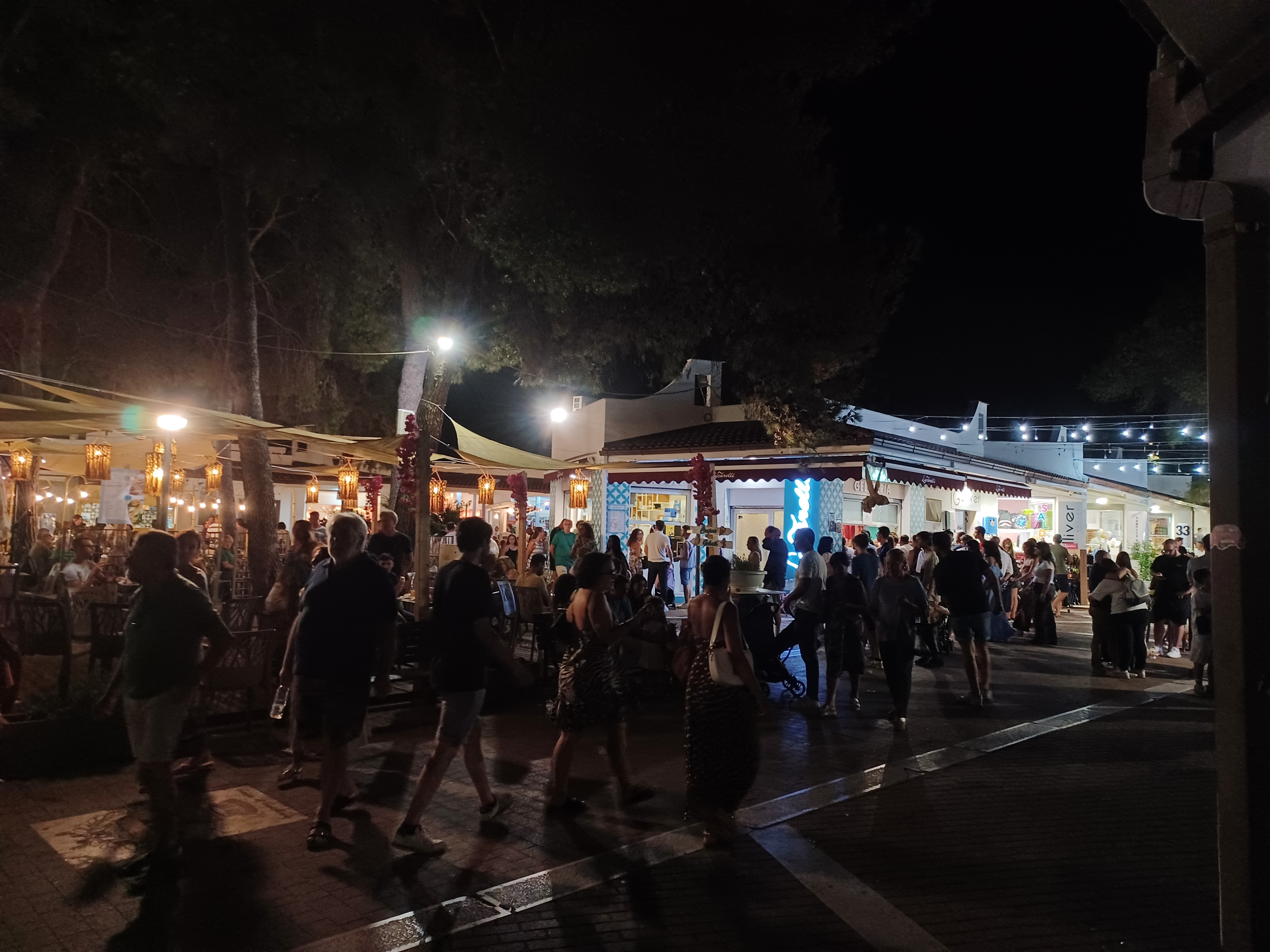
Piazza Selene on a lively summer night

Tourist Medical Service Building

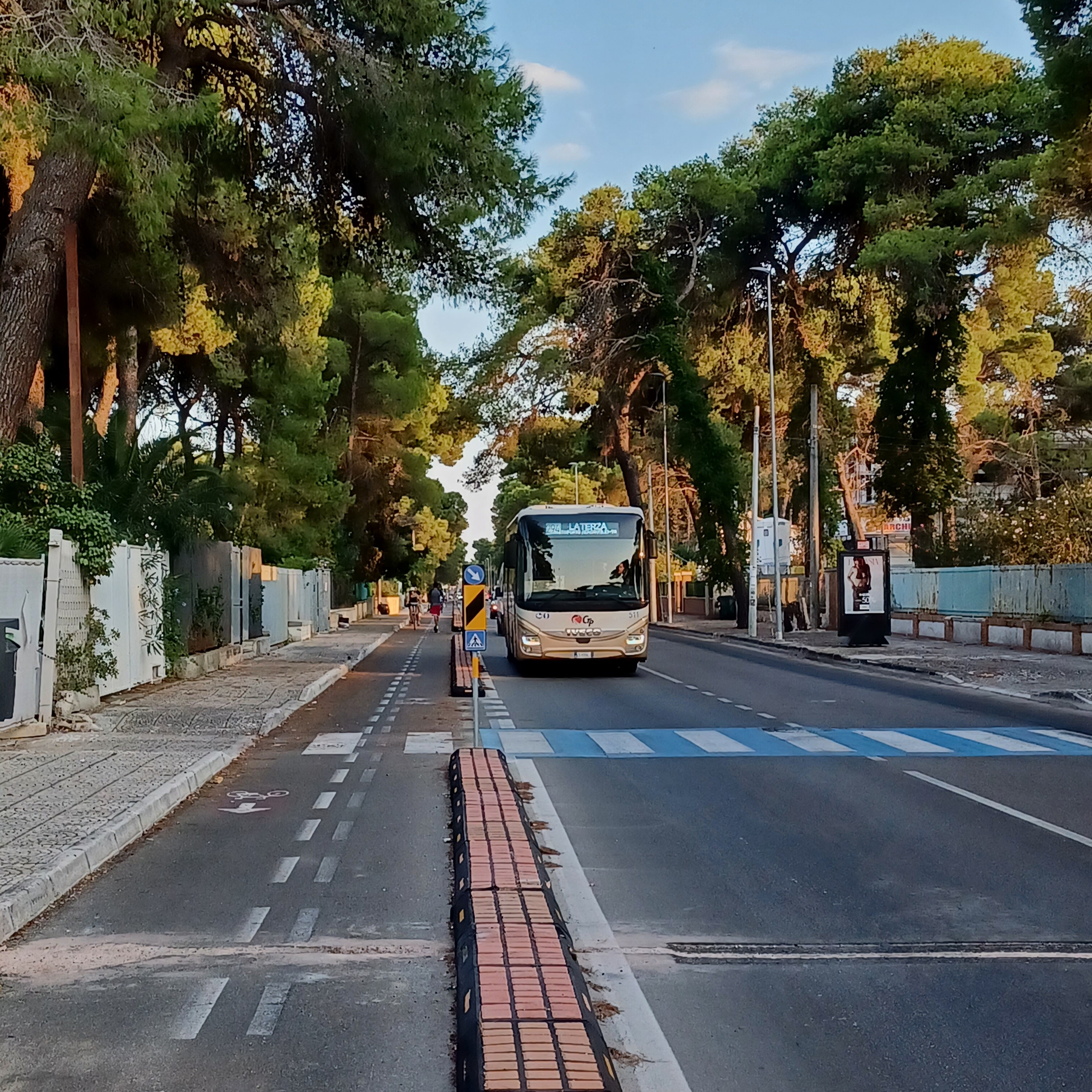
The last daily run of route 294, headed towards Taranto

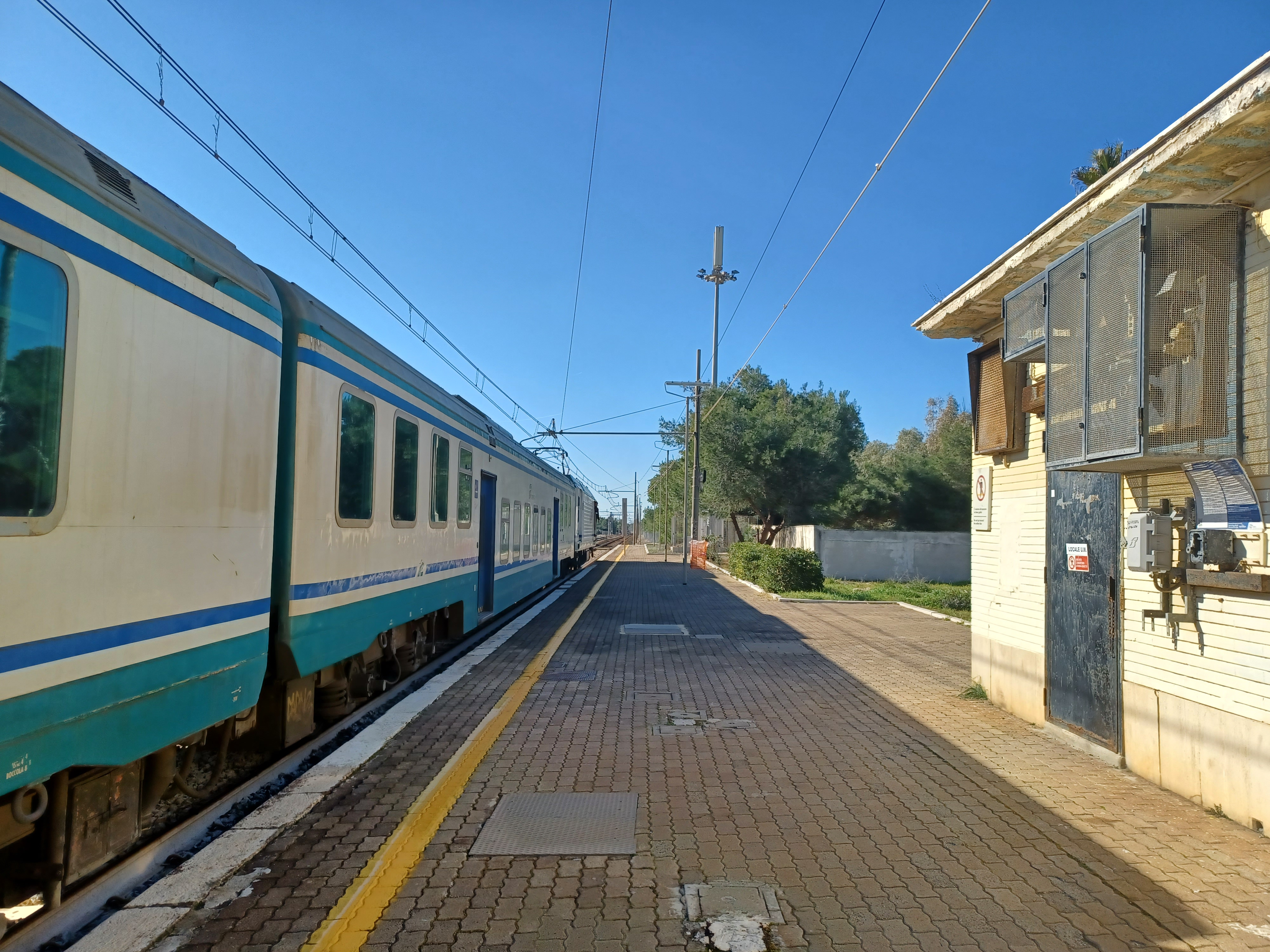
The station with a morning regional train

Piazza Selene at midnight; august 2026

The Municipal Coat of Arms in Piazza Selene

Stella Maris church on a summer midday

Garden in front of Stella Maris church

Stella Maris Auditorium building; summer midday

Entrance to the Stella Maris Auditorium at night

The bike lane linking the city centre to the basketball court

The basketball court between the seafront and the city centre

The Calabrian mountains seen from the beach at sunset; August 2026

The beach at twilight, viewed from the sea

Beach view of Taranto's lights; morning twilight -July 2023
