= Flato =

Flato is a surname. Notable people with the surname include:

- Charles Flato (1908–1984), American writer, American Communist Party member, and Soviet agent
- Paul Flato (1900–1999), American jeweler
- Stanisław Flato (1910–1972), Polish army intelligence officer and diplomat

== See also ==
- Lato (surname)
