= Lato (disambiguation) =

Lato (Λατώ) was an ancient city of Crete.

Lato may also refer to:

- Lato (surname)
- Lato (river), an Italian river
- Lato (typeface), a humanist sans-serif font
- Latô (Caulerpa lentillifera), an edible seaweed
- Lato, a game for Android devices - published on F-Droid and Gitlab

== See also ==
- Leto
