= Lato (river) =

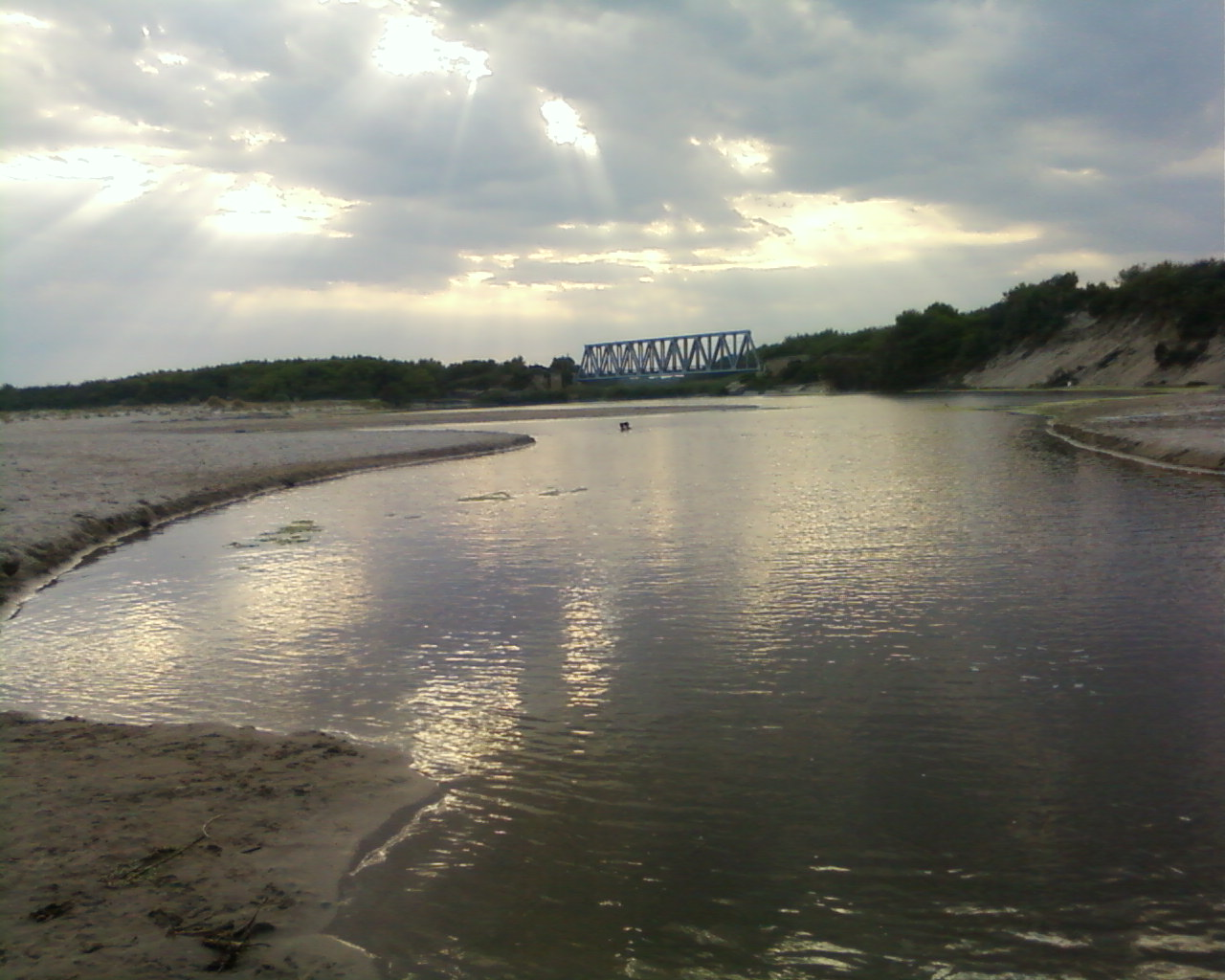

Location
- Country: Italy

Physical characteristics
- Source
  - location: north of Laterza
- Mouth: Gulf of Taranto
  - coordinates: 40.4945°N 16.9926°E
- Length: 5 km (3.1 mi)

The Lato is a river in the province of Taranto in the Apulia region of southern Italy. Its source is north of Laterza near the border with the province of Bari. The river flows south near Laterza and Ginosa before curving southeast. It flows near Case Perrone before flowing into the Gulf of Taranto near Castellaneta Marina.
