= Palazzo Margherita (Bernalda) =

Building in Basilicata, Italy

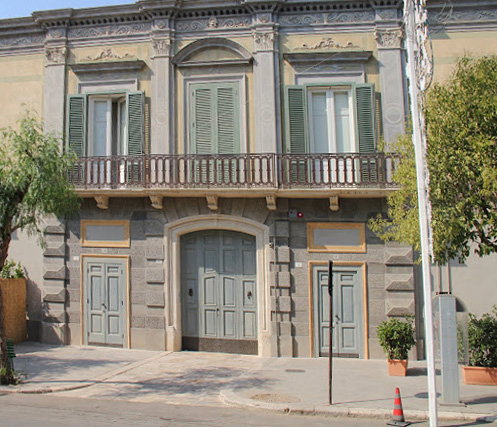
Palazzo Margherita

The Palazzo Margherita is a palazzo in Bernalda, a small town in the Basilicata region of Southern Italy. It was built in 1892 by the family of Giuseppe Margherita. Currently it serves as a small luxury hotel owned by Francis Ford Coppola.

== History ==
The Palazzo Margherita is currently the property of Francis Ford Coppola. In 1904 the film director's grandfather left Bernalda for a new life in the United States. The Palazzo was the location for Sofia Coppola's wedding to Thomas Mars in August 2011. The Coppola family purchased the Palazzo in 2004 and converted it into a small luxury hotel.

== In popular culture ==
Palazzo Margherita was featured in an episode of Parts Unknown with Anthony Bourdain dining with Coppola.
