= Lake Salinella =

Coastal lake in Apulia and Basilicata, Italy

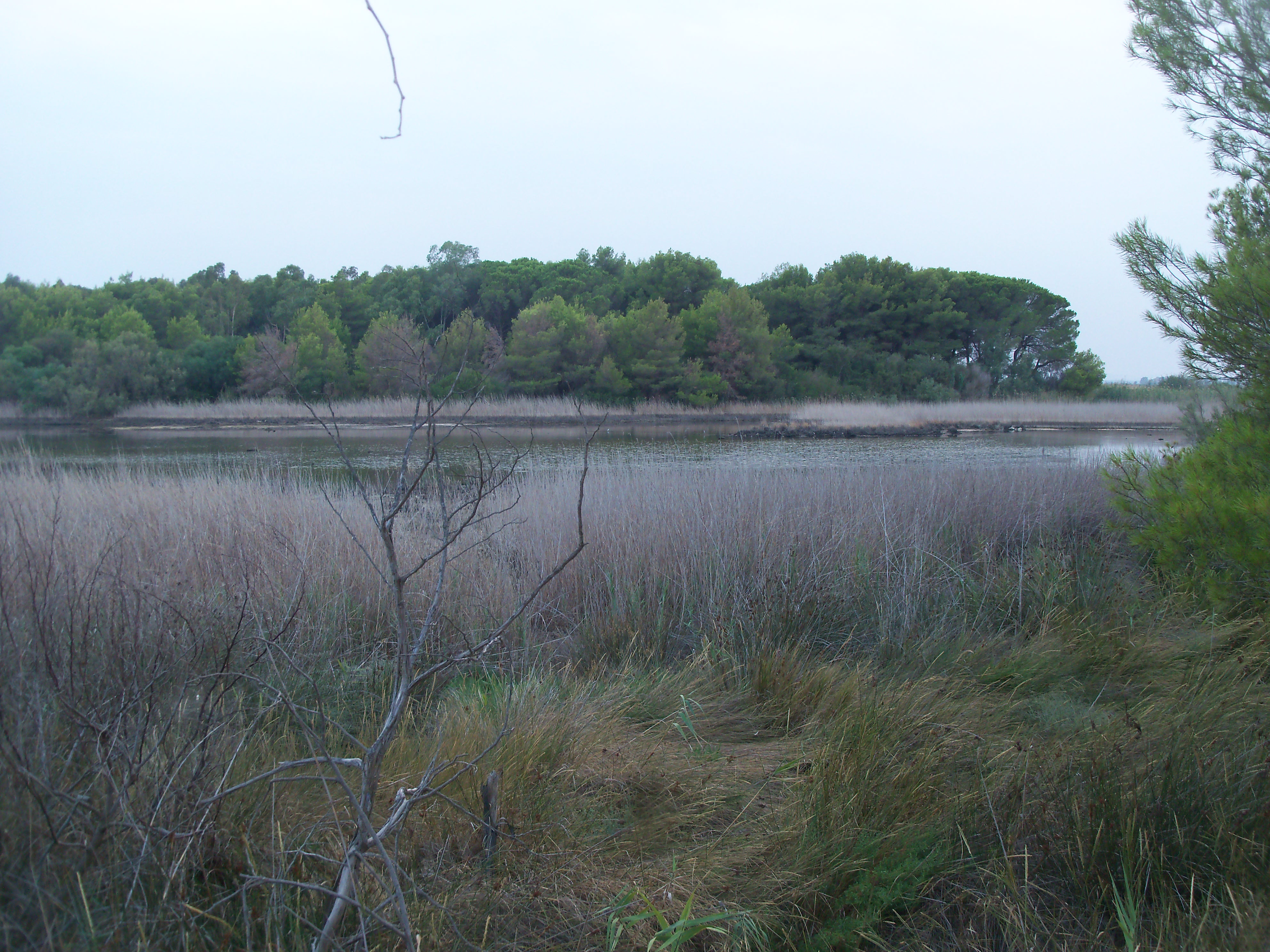
- View of Lake Salinella from the north side
- Interactive map of Lake Salinella
- Location: Ginosa (Province of Taranto), Bernalda (Province of Matera), Apulia, Basilicata, Italy
- Coordinates: 40°23′58″N 16°51′47″E
- Type: Coastal
- Basin countries: Italy
- Surface area: 1.4 km^{2} (0.54 sq mi)

The Lake Salinella is a small coastal back-dune lake, neatly divided in two by the border between Apulia and Basilicata within the protected area Stornara Nature Reserve in the locality of Torre Mattoni-Lake Salinella. It is precisely located between the hamlet Marina di Ginosa of the municipality of Ginosa (in the Province of Taranto) and the hamlet Metaponto of the municipality of Bernalda (in the Province of Matera).

== Characteristics ==
The lake extends into a wetland back-dune area (the most important in the Province of Taranto) formed at the old mouth of the Bradano River. Its habitat makes it ideal for the residence of storks.

For this reason, it has been protected, established by the Apulia Regional Law No. 19 of 24 July 1997. In 1996, the lake and surrounding dunes, covering a protected area of 140 hectares, were entrusted to the management of Lipu.

The lake is situated within the natural area Pinete dell’Arco Ionico, Site of Community Importance SIC IT9130006 (Directive 92/43/EEC). It is also part of the Site of Community Importance of the Ionian coast Foce Bradano SIC IT9220090.

It can only be visited during the summer period. To view it, one must cross (with prior authorization) a tourist village, despite the Ginosa Municipality's General Regulatory Plan mandating public access. It is possible to visit it from the Basilicata side, in the Municipality of Bernalda, by fording the Bradano River with the assistance of naturalistic guides.

To the east of the lake, in the Apulian part of it, there is a coastal tower built in the 16th century, Torre Mattoni.

The protected area can be visited with the support of guides from the CEA Bernalda e Metaponto association, by prior reservation.

== Flora and fauna ==
The water body is surrounded by a belt of Bolboschoenus maritimus and other plants such as Halocnemum strobilaceum, Arthrocaulon macrostachyum, and Suaeda vera. Additionally, the maquis shrubland, which surrounds the small lake, is enriched with phillyrea (Phillyrea angustifolia), mastic (Pistacia lentiscus), buckthorn (Rhamnus alaternus), and rare specimens of Phoenician juniper (Juniperus phoenicea).

== Image gallery ==
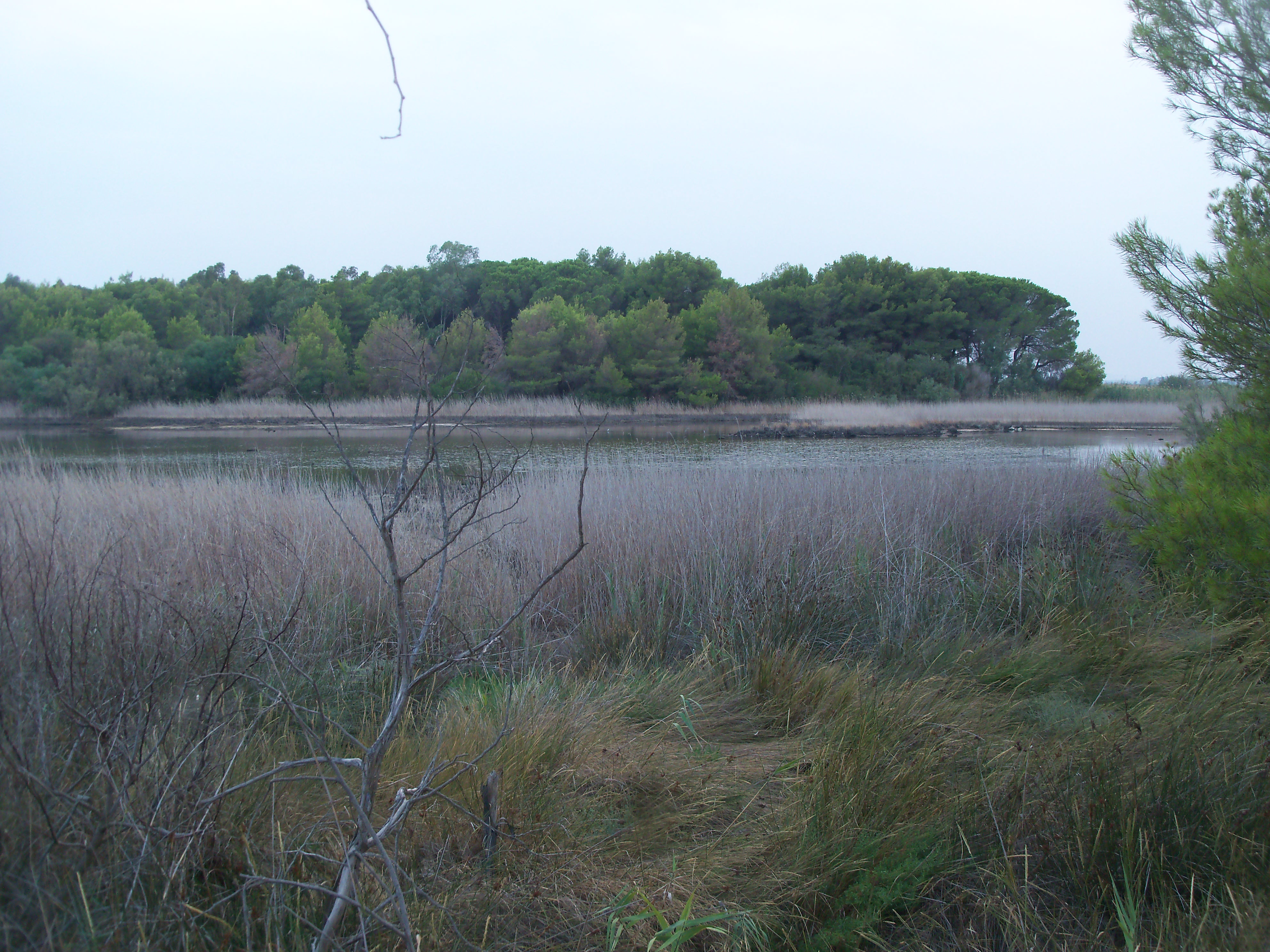
View of Lake Salinella

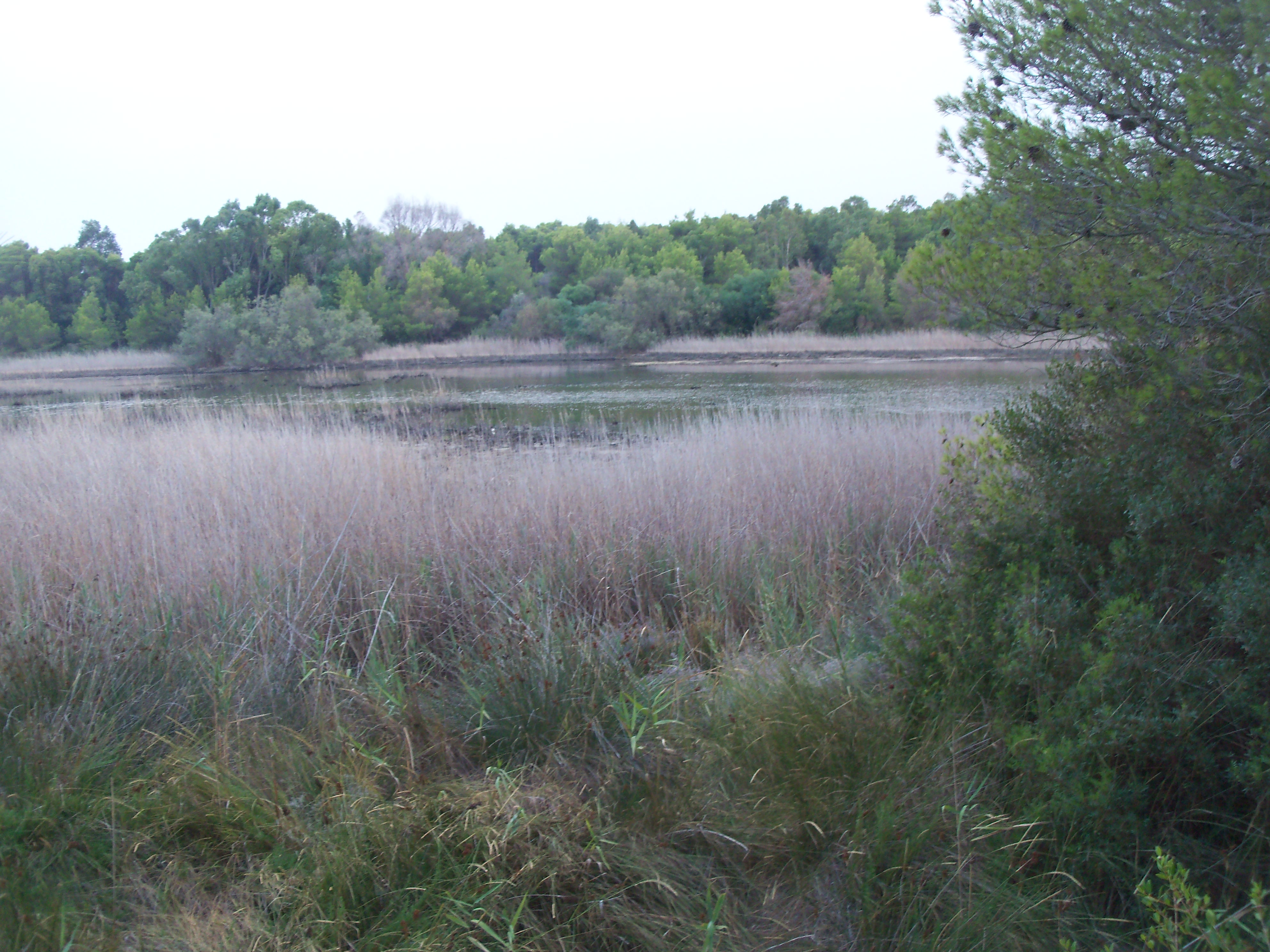
View of Lake Salinella

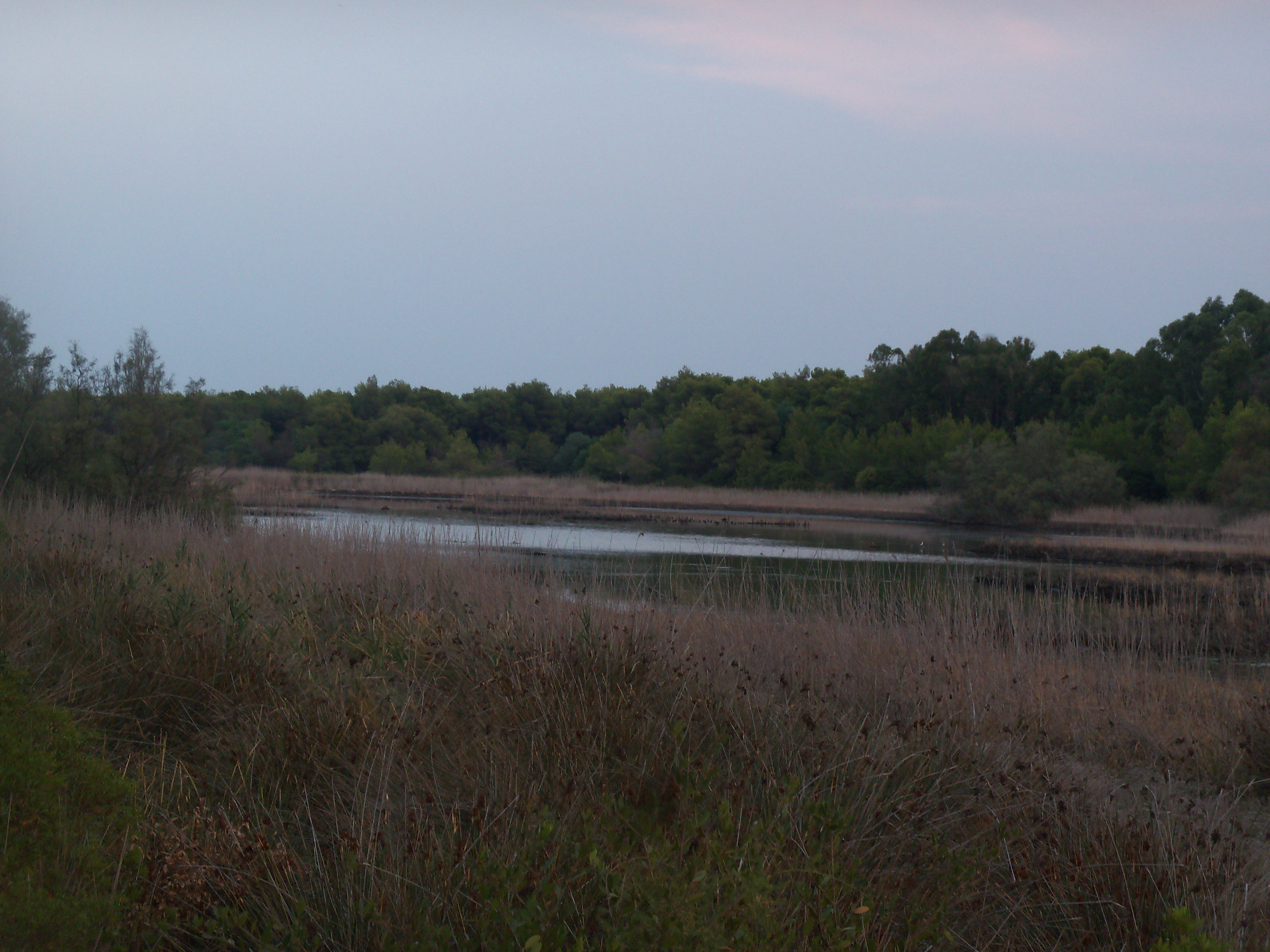
View of Lake Salinella

== See also ==
- Marina di Ginosa, hamlet of Ginosa
- Metaponto, hamlet of Bernalda

== Bibliography ==
- Gehu, J. M. (1984). Essai synsystématique ex synchrologique sur les végétations littorales italiennes dans un bût conservatoire [Synsystematic and Synchorological Essay on Italian Coastal Vegetation for Conservation Purposes] (in French). Vol. 8.
- Aleffi, M. (1986). Natura ed ambiente nella Provincia di Taranto [Nature and Environment in the Province of Taranto] (in Italian). Martina Franca: Ricerche Umanesimo della Pietra.
