= Castellaneta Marina railway station =

Railway station in Italy

Castellaneta Marina
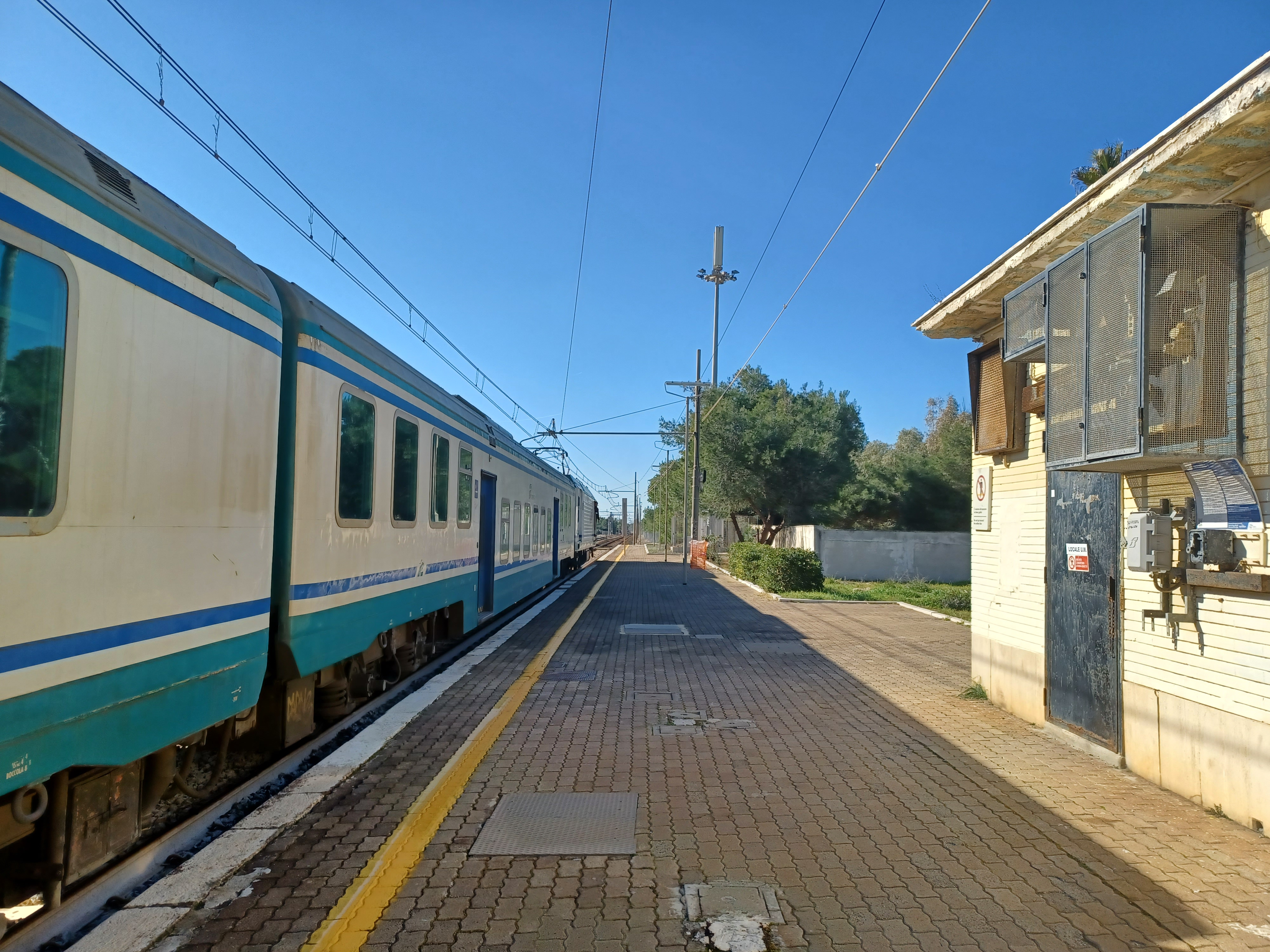
- Castellaneta Marina railway station

General information
- Location: Castellaneta Marina, Province of Taranto, Apulia; Italy
- Coordinates: 40°28′52″N 16°57′56″E
- Owner: Rete Ferroviaria Italiana
- Operator: Trenitalia
- Line: Taranto–Reggio di Calabria railway
- Platforms: 1
Location
- Location within Apulia Location within Italy

Castellaneta Marina is a railway station in Castellaneta Marina, Italy. The station is located on the Taranto–Reggio di Calabria railway. The train services are operated by Trenitalia.

== Train services ==
The station is served by the following service(s):

- Regional services (Treno regionale) Naples - Salerno - Potenza - Metaponto - Taranto
