= Maiolica di Laterza =

Kind of maiolica made in Laterza, Apulia, Italy

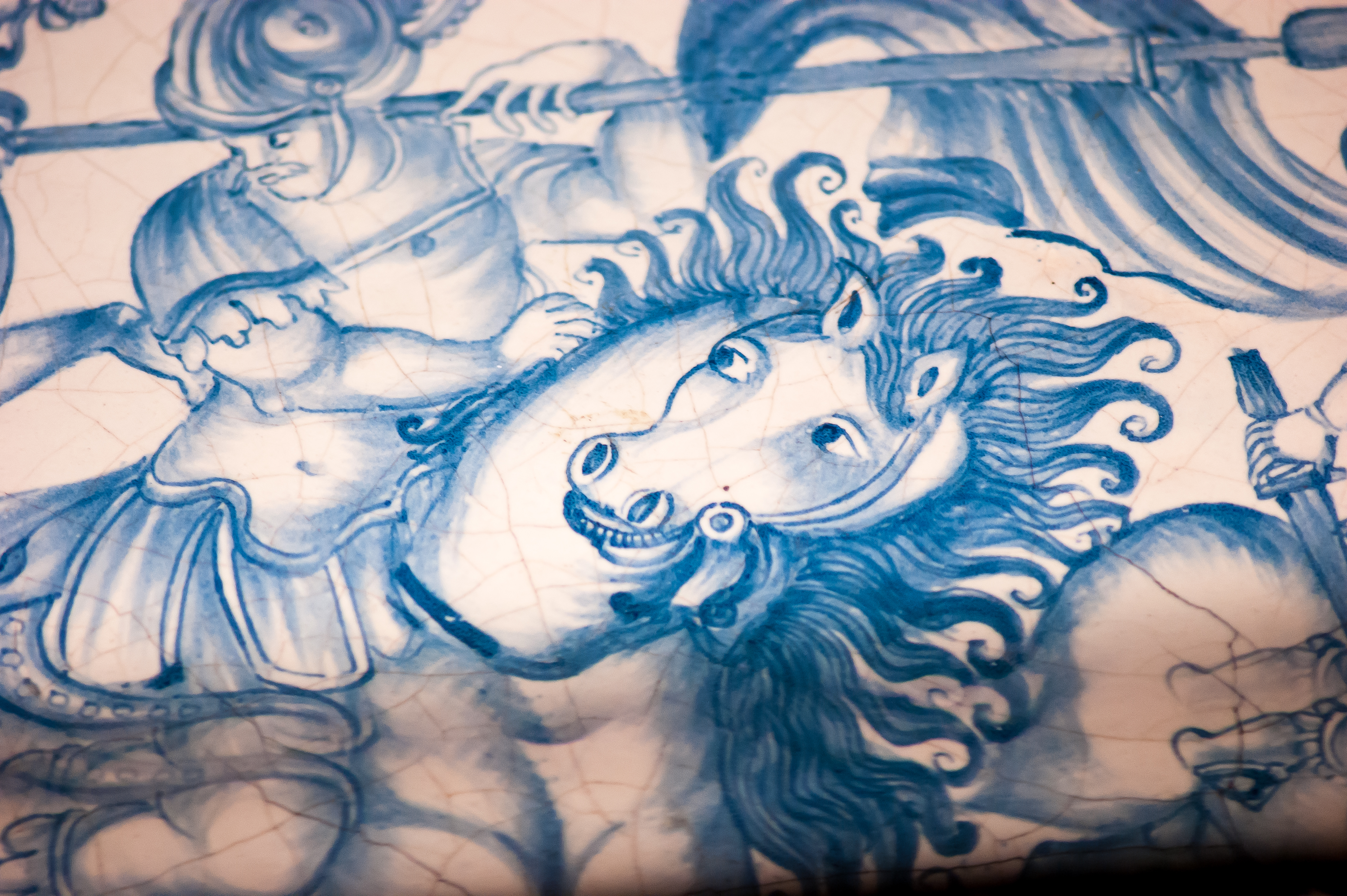
Maiolica di Laterza

The Maiolica di Laterza is a kind of maiolica made in the town of Laterza, part of the Apulia region in Italy.

The Maiolica di Laterza is made under the CAT label (Traditional Artistic Ceramic) established in 1997 under statutory order from the Italian Ministry of Commerce, Industry and Handicrafts.

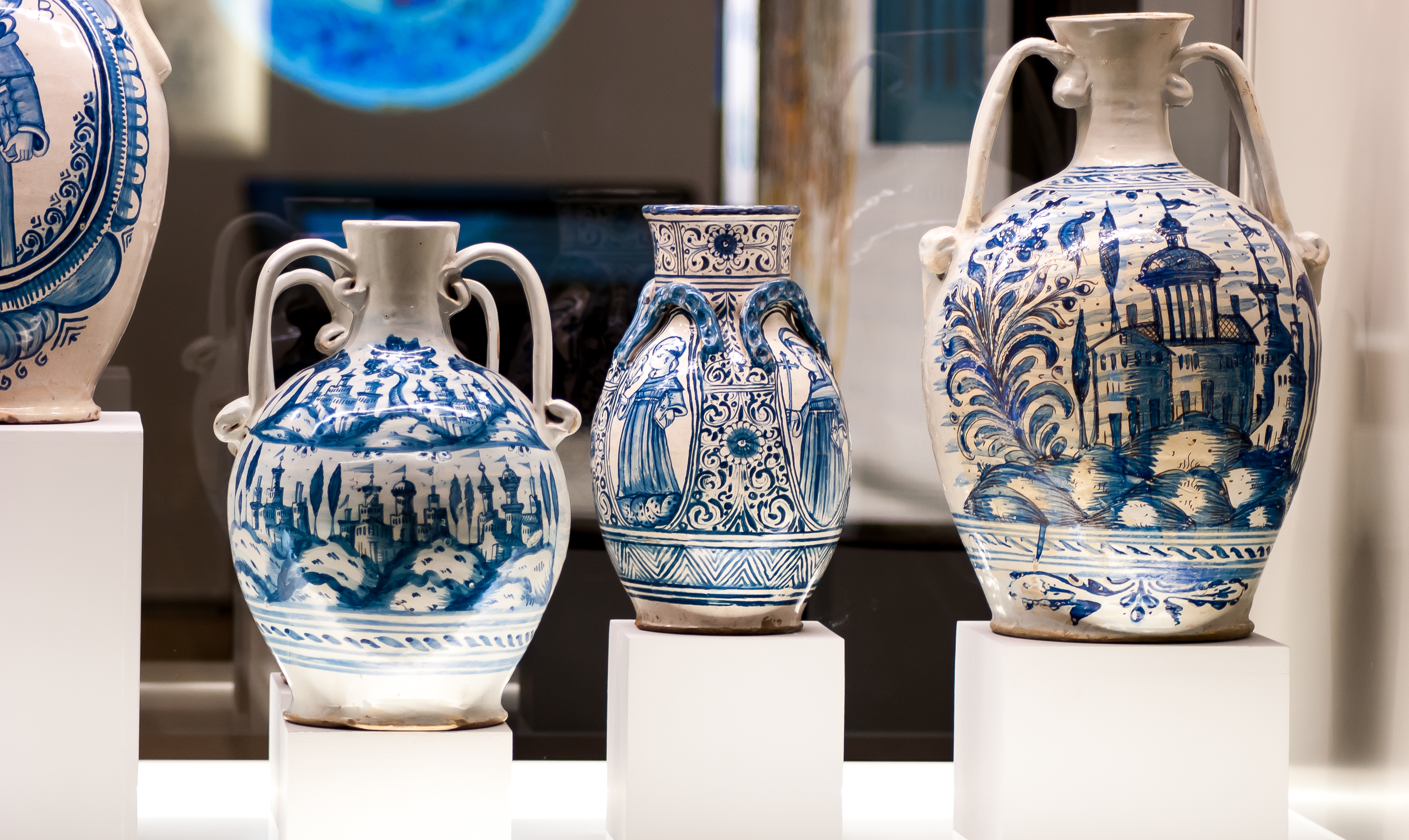

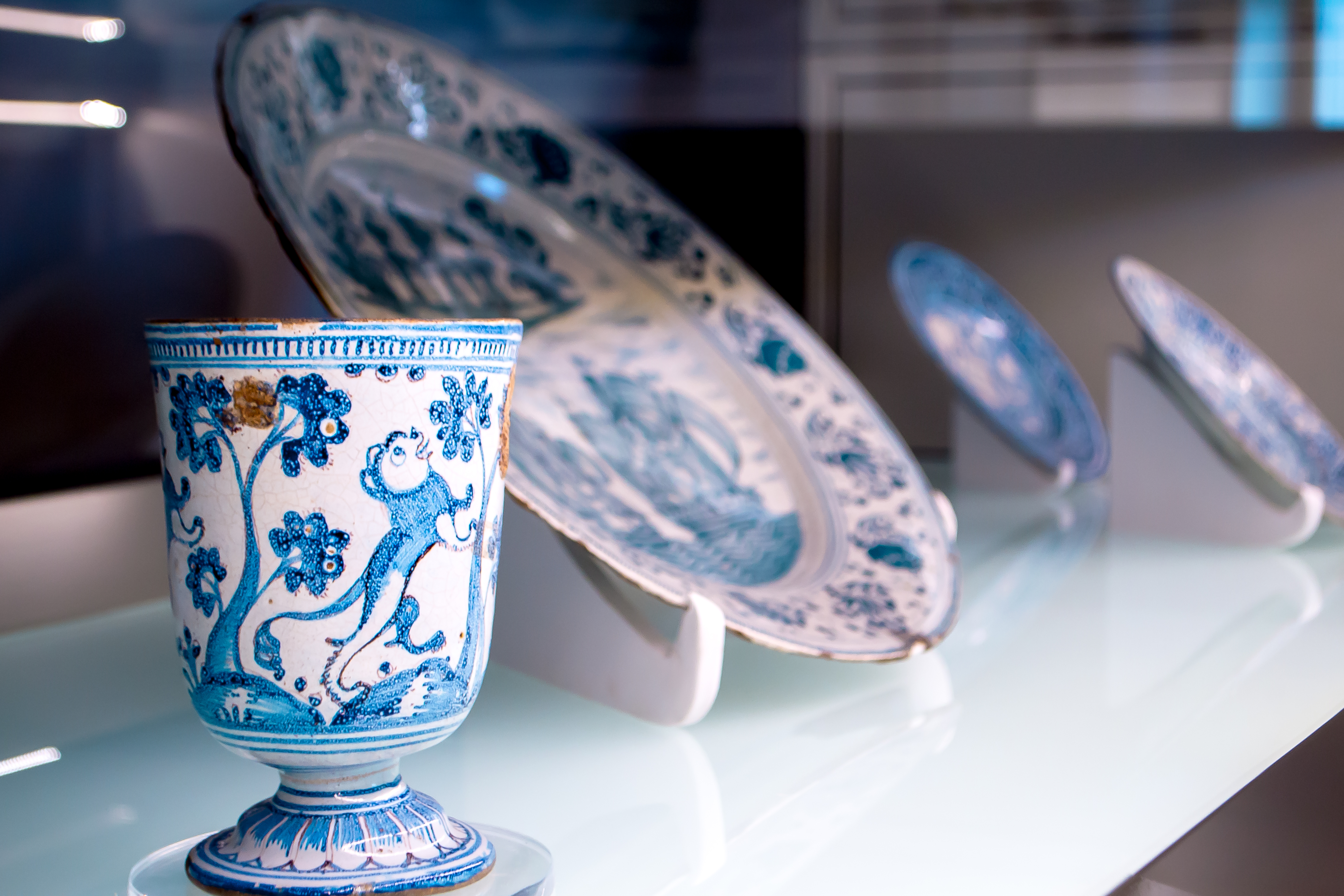

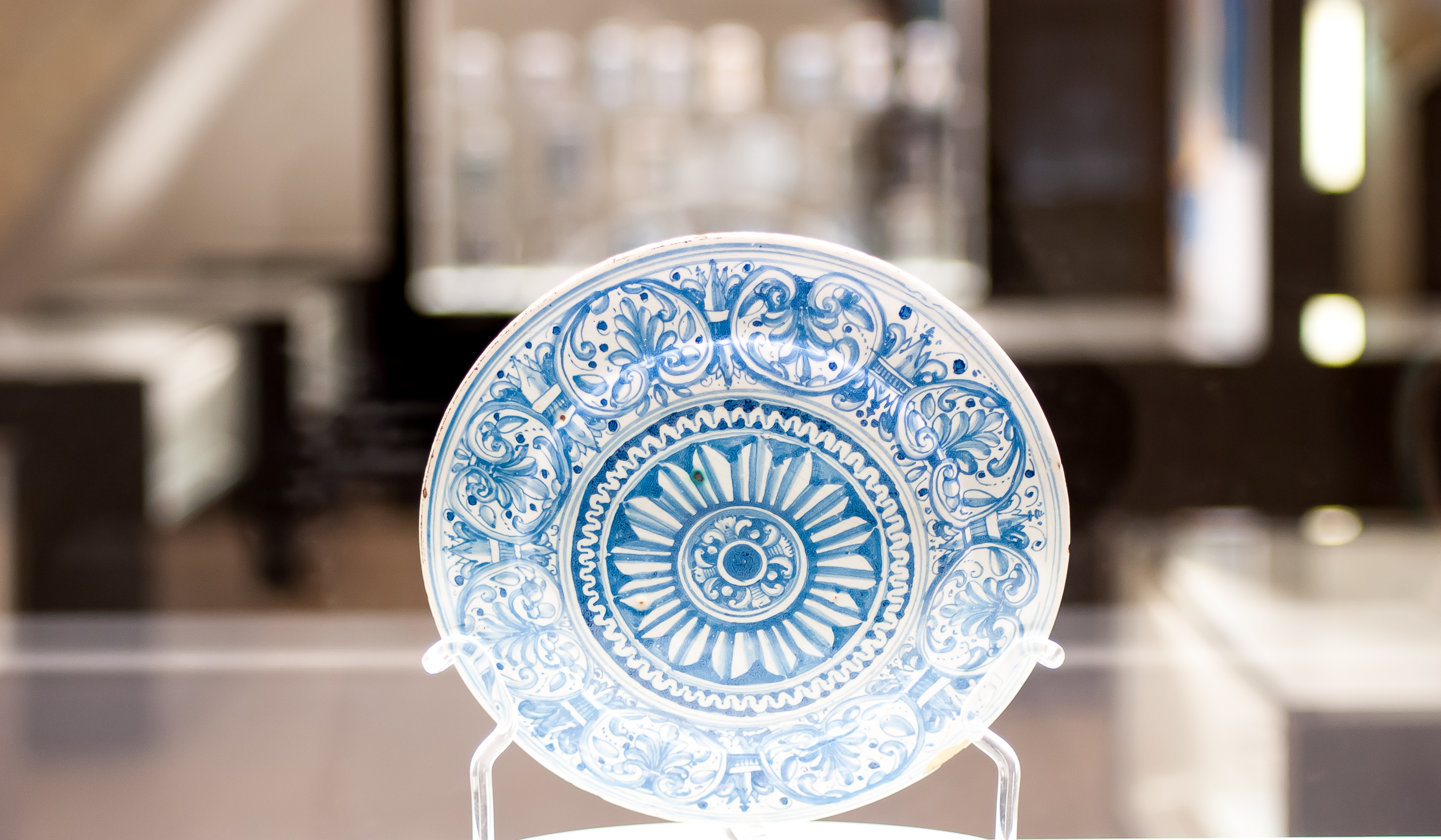
