= Bernalda =

Municipality in Basilicata, Italy

- Comune
- Comune di Bernalda
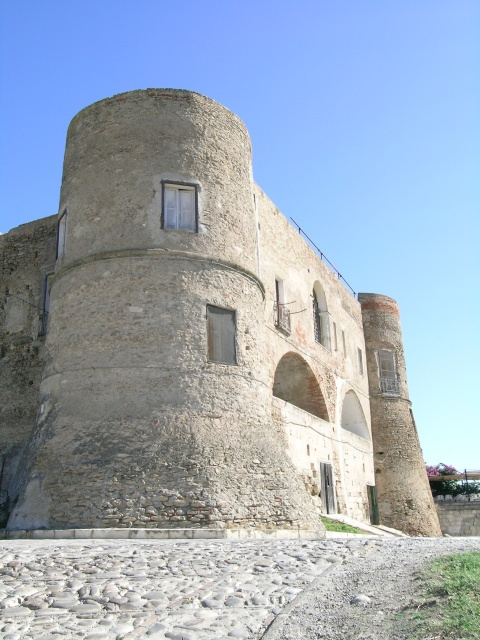
- Castle of Bernalda

- Flag Coat of arms

- Location of Bernalda in Italy Bernalda (Basilicata)
- Coordinates: 40°25′N 16°41′E
- Country: Italy
- Region: Basilicata
- Province: Matera (MT)
- Frazioni: Metaponto, Serra Marina, Spineto

Government
  - Mayor: Domenico Raffaele Tataranno

Area
  - Total: 126.19 km^{2} (48.72 sq mi)
- Elevation: 127 m (417 ft)

Population (2026)
  - Total: 11,922
  - Density: 94.477/km^{2} (244.69/sq mi)
- Demonym: Bernaldesi
- Time zone: UTC+1 (CET)
  - Summer (DST): UTC+2 (CEST)
- Postal code: 75012
- Dialing code: 0835
- ISTAT code: 077003
- Patron saint: St. Bernardino of Siena
- Saint day: 20 May, 23 August
- Website: Official website

Bernalda (Metapontino: Vernàlle or Bernàlle) is a town and comune (municipality) in the Province of Matera in the region of Basilicata in Italy. It has 11,922 inhabitants.

The nearby village of Metaponto is the site of the ancient city of Metapontum.

Until the 15th century, it was called Camarda. It is home to a castle built in the 15th century during the Aragonese rule in the Kingdom of Naples.

The patron Saint of Bernalda is Saint Bernardino of Siena. The celebration of Saint Bernardino is on 20 May and on 23 August.

== Demographics ==
As of 2026, the population is 11,922, of which 51.1% are male, and 48.9% are female. Minors make up 14.3% of the population, and seniors make up 25%.

Historical population

Year	Pop.	±%
1861	6,097	—
1871	6,455	+5.9%
1881	7,176	+11.2%
1901	7,324	+2.1%
1911	7,369	+0.6%
1921	7,239	−1.8%
1931	7,676	+6.0%
1936	8,380	+9.2%

Year	Pop.	±%
1951	10,080	+20.3%
1961	10,571	+4.9%
1971	10,753	+1.7%
1981	11,748	+9.3%
1991	12,037	+2.5%
2001	11,958	−0.7%
2011	12,264	+2.6%
2021	11,964	−2.4%

Source: ISTAT

=== Immigration ===
As of 2025, of the known countries of birth of 11,727 residents, the most numerous are: Italy (10,558 – 90%), Albania (262 – 2.2%), Romania (242 – 2.1%), Germany (137 – 1.2%), Algeria (135 – 1.2%).

== Sights ==
=== Religious buildings ===
- Mother Church, built in the 1530s by Bernardino de Bernaudo. Originally the church was very small with only one nave. During the XVII, the church was built up with a second nave. In the church there were: a cemetery for priests under the choir, and a second cemetery, near the baptismal font, for children who died within the seventh year of life. The church was refurbished in the 1950s, 1960s and 2000s.
- Church of Our Lady of Mount Carmel: this church was subject to at least two or three refurbishments and amplifications, before obtaining the current appearance. In 1678 the church was received an altar with the image of the Our Lady of Mount Carmel painted on the wall. In the second half of the 19th century, it was enlarged to accommodate the statues and a big wooden 17th-century crucifix.
- Convent Church. The Convent of St. Antonio from Padova, with the attached church, was founded in 1616. At the time of the titling of the church, two factions arranged among the observants: a part that wanted to dedicate the church to the Immaculate, the other one to St. Antonio from Padova. The fate chose St. Antonio. The current front of the church was built in the 19th century. After the Italian unification many properties, often of historical importance and owned by the Ecclesiastical Fund, became state assets. So that the monks made over their convent to the Municipal offices. In the right nave is located the 19th-century crucifix.

=== Other sights ===
The castle was probably built by the Normans in the 11th century and restored by the Aragonese during their domination, when it was enlarged, fortified and protected with a moat and a drawbridge. On the west side there is a thin square tower considered more ancient than the other towers of round shape. The façade of the Castle that overlooks the Mother Church is the result of a later restoration.

Palaces include:

- Palazzo Margherita
- Palazzo Dell'Osso
- Palazzo Fischetti
- Palazzo Lacava
- Palazzo Guida
- Palazzo Appio

== Local dishes ==
- Crapiata
- Cialledda
- Scorzette pastries

== Notable people ==
- Coppola family

== Twin towns and sister cities ==
Bernalda is twinned with:

- L'Aquila, Italy
- Siena, Italy
- Massa Marittima, Italy
- Mirabella Eclano, Italy
- Venosa, Italy
- Marsicovetere, Italy

== See also ==
- Lake Salinella
