= Pane di Laterza =

Traditional bread of Laterza, Apulia, Italy

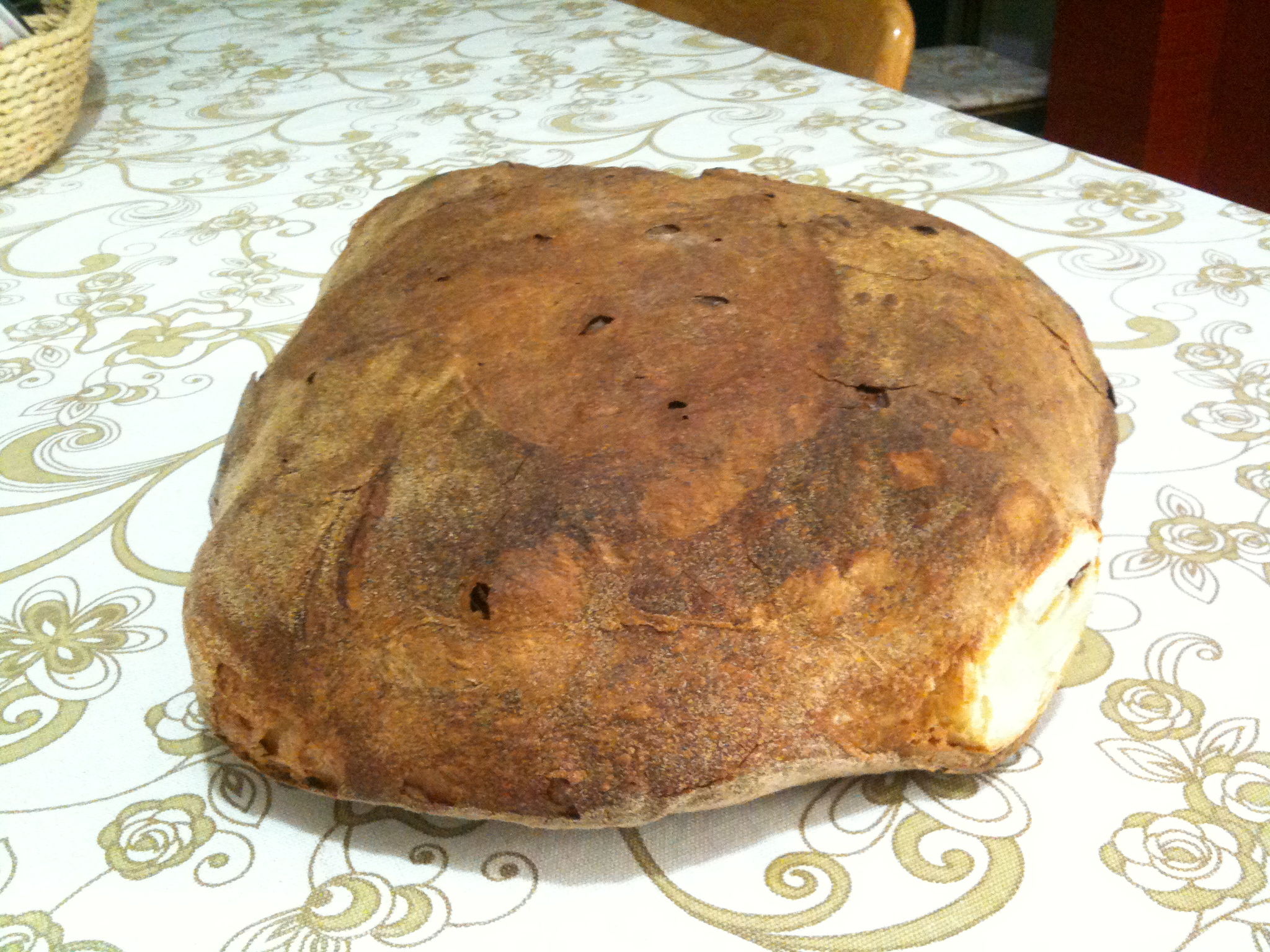
- Type: Bread
- Place of origin: Italy
- Region or state: Laterza, Apulia
- Main ingredients: Durum wheat flour

Pane di Laterza is a traditional bread of Laterza, a municipality (comune) in the province of Taranto, Italy. It is made with durum wheat flour with water, salt, and sourdough. It is mainly produced in Laterza, but it can be also found in neighbouring comuni. It has been recognised by the Italian Ministry of the Agriculture, Food and Forestry Policies as a prodotto agroalimentare tradizionale (PAT) of Apulia.

== Origins ==
Agriculture was historically a significant sector in the economy of Lazerta. The first evidence of the use of cereals intended for the production of bread date back to 5th century BCE. Spelt and barley were the most common cereals used in baking, particularly for focaccia. After the fall of the Roman Empire, for several centuries, the production of bread was reserved for the nobility, who could afford to manage a bakery. An ancient bread oven, which was found to have belonged to a feudatory and to have been active until the 18th century, was discovered in the district of Laterza nowadays named Fornaci (literally translated from Italian as 'furnaces' which also signifies 'bakeries').

In the 1950s, bakeries of Laterza were managed by only four women: a baker and three workers. The workers prepared the firewood and took the dough from the houses of the village. The baker cooked it and then the workers brought the baked bread in the houses again.

== Characteristics ==
Pane di Laterza is baked in the wood oven with olive wood with some other natural aromatic products such as seeds of apricot and almonds. The size of each piece of bread (called panelle or panédd in local dialect) can amount to one, two or four kilograms. The crust is brown while the soft part inside the bread is ivory-coloured.

The estimated nutritional value of the bread for 100 grams is:

Water	Protein	Fat	Carbohydrate	Fiber	Energy Value
28	10	2,3	49	9,8	257 kcal

== Consortium ==
Consorzio per il Pane di Laterza, Laterza (Taranto).

Laterza is also a member of the Associazione nazionale città del pane ('National Association of the Cities of Bread'), an Italian organization with the aim of promoting and enhancing the traditional types of bread.

== See also ==
- Pane di Altamura
