= Marina di Ginosa =

- Frazione
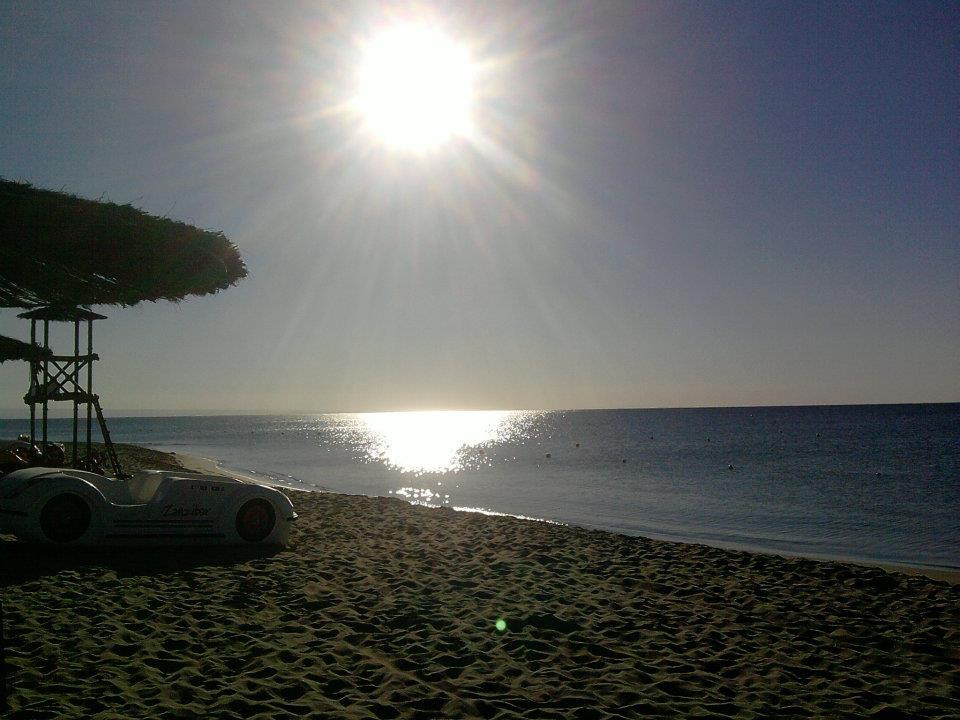

- Location of Marina di Ginosa in Italy
- Coordinates: 40°25′45″N 16°53′27″E
- Country: Italy
- Region: Apulia
- Province: Province of Taranto
- Comune: Ginosa
- Elevation: 12 m (39 ft)

Population (2010)
  - Total: c. 5,000
- Demonym: marinesi
- Time zone: UTC+1 (CET)
  - Summer (DST): UTC+2 (CEST)
- Postal code: 74025
- Dialing code: 099
- Patron saint: Saint Anthony
- Saint day: 13 and 14 June

Marina di Ginosa is a frazione (a type of territorial subdivision in Italy) of the municipality of Ginosa (in the province of Taranto, Apulia). It is a seaside resort in Gulf of Taranto. Its inhabitants are called Marinese. It is also called Ginosa Marina.

== History ==
Marina di Ginosa was originally called Ginosa Scalo for the presence of the railway station. It was also known as Stornara because of the common starling, many of which return in autumn, or Twenty-five for the location of the toll-booth at km 25 of the former SS580 (i.e. at its end) and the signalling control number.

In 1958, the village was given the official designation of Marina di Ginosa by the then President of the Republic.

Today, Marina di Ginosa has a larger urban fabric than Ginosa City, and it has a permanent population of about 5,000. Marina di Ginosa was severely hit by a flood in the night from 1 to 2 March 2011.

== Climate ==
Marina di Ginosa has a hot-summer mediterranean climate (Köppen Csa). Being in the interior of a bay, the location receives inland heatwaves more frequently than most mediterranean coastlines. This leads to unusually warm coastal days in summer by mainland Italian standards. Rainfall is infrequent but heavy enough when it arrives to ensure about 500 millimetres (20 in) annually. The municipal seat is likely even hotter in summer due to the relative distance from the coastline.

Climate data for Marina di Ginosa (1991–2020 normals), 12 m asl, extremes since 1967
| Month | Jan | Feb | Mar | Apr | May | Jun | Jul | Aug | Sep | Oct | Nov | Dec | Year |
|---|---|---|---|---|---|---|---|---|---|---|---|---|---|
| Record high °C (°F) | 22.4 (72.3) | 23.4 (74.1) | 28.0 (82.4) | 31.2 (88.2) | 33.2 (91.8) | 43.6 (110.5) | 43.4 (110.1) | 43.2 (109.8) | 39.0 (102.2) | 30.4 (86.7) | 28.2 (82.8) | 22.4 (72.3) | 43.6 (110.5) |
| Mean daily maximum °C (°F) | 13.4 (56.1) | 14.3 (57.7) | 16.7 (62.1) | 19.8 (67.6) | 24.2 (75.6) | 29.4 (84.9) | 32.5 (90.5) | 32.5 (90.5) | 28.0 (82.4) | 23.3 (73.9) | 18.7 (65.7) | 14.5 (58.1) | 22.4 (72.3) |
| Daily mean °C (°F) | 9.5 (49.1) | 9.9 (49.8) | 11.9 (53.4) | 14.8 (58.6) | 19.2 (66.6) | 23.8 (74.8) | 26.6 (79.9) | 26.8 (80.2) | 22.8 (73.0) | 18.6 (65.5) | 14.4 (57.9) | 10.7 (51.3) | 17.7 (63.9) |
| Mean daily minimum °C (°F) | 5.8 (42.4) | 6.1 (43.0) | 8.1 (46.6) | 10.7 (51.3) | 14.5 (58.1) | 18.7 (65.7) | 21.3 (70.3) | 21.6 (70.9) | 18.3 (64.9) | 14.6 (58.3) | 11.0 (51.8) | 7.2 (45.0) | 13.4 (56.1) |
| Record low °C (°F) | −5.0 (23.0) | −2.8 (27.0) | −2.6 (27.3) | −1.8 (28.8) | 4.0 (39.2) | 7.6 (45.7) | 12.0 (53.6) | 12.8 (55.0) | 8.6 (47.5) | 5.0 (41.0) | 0.0 (32.0) | −3.0 (26.6) | −5.0 (23.0) |
| Average precipitation mm (inches) | 56.5 (2.22) | 34.8 (1.37) | 45.7 (1.80) | 37.8 (1.49) | 29.4 (1.16) | 23.1 (0.91) | 19.9 (0.78) | 18.5 (0.73) | 46.6 (1.83) | 56.1 (2.21) | 74.3 (2.93) | 60.1 (2.37) | 502.8 (19.8) |
| Average precipitation days (≥ 1 mm) | 6.6 | 6.1 | 6.7 | 6.6 | 5.6 | 4.0 | 1.7 | 1.7 | 4.2 | 5.3 | 5.8 | 5.2 | 59.5 |
| Average relative humidity (%) | 78.0 | 74.8 | 72.9 | 72.7 | 70.8 | 66.7 | 63.2 | 66.2 | 71.0 | 75.5 | 78.2 | 78.0 | 72.3 |
| Average dew point °C (°F) | 5.8 (42.4) | 5.7 (42.3) | 7.3 (45.1) | 10.0 (50.0) | 14.0 (57.2) | 17.3 (63.1) | 19.1 (66.4) | 20.2 (68.4) | 17.5 (63.5) | 14.4 (57.9) | 10.8 (51.4) | 7.1 (44.8) | 12.4 (54.4) |
Source 1: Météo Climat
Source 2: NOAA(Humidity and Dew point)

== Physical Geography ==
For the quality of the sea and sandy beaches, the Foundation for Environmental Education (FEE) has awarded Marina di Ginosa the Blue Flag numerous times: the first in 1995, in the years from 1997 to 2001, and continuously from 2004 to 2021. It received, for the 2009 summer season, the 3 Blue Sails from Legambiente. The predominant feature of the beaches of Marina di Ginosa is the pine forest of Mediterranean bush that frames the entire coast for kilometers. These pine forests are part of the protected natural area "Pinete dell'Arco Ionico". There is a small lake, Lake Salinella, which is located about 5 km from the town on the road to Metaponto, which is destined to become a natural oasis. On the shore of Lake Salinella, there is an ancient coastal tower, dating back to the XVI century, built to defend the Ionian coasts from Turkish incursions into southern Italy: "Torre Mattoni". To the west of the inhabited area flows the torrent of the Galaso river.

== Places and Monuments of Interest ==
The main place of interest in Marina di Ginosa is Lake Salinella, a coastal lake behind the dunes on the border between Apulia and Basilicata, occupying the terminal stretch of the ancient river bed of the Bradano river; the lake is an important place where many migratory species stop where it is possible to devote oneself to birdwatching. Also worth visiting are Torre Mattoni, a coastal watchtower from the Middle Ages at the mouth of the Bradano, and the green lungs of the town, the Pineta Regina and the Pineta Cavese.

== Culture ==
The municipality of Ginosa has established a library system by equipping Marina di Ginosa with the Marinese Civic Library.

== Sport ==
Football

The reference football team is Ginosa, but from 1979 to 1997 the fraction had its own football team called Stella Maris, which played 15 Third Category championships and 2 Second Category championships. Two amateur level clubs had already been founded in 1971: Stella Marina 74025 and Polisportiva Maris, which in 1979 merged into a single company renamed Stella Maris di Marina di Ginosa and affiliated with the FIGC to compete in amateur championships. The initial prerogative of the team was to field only players residing in Ginosa Marina. In the 1979-1980 debut year, the Marinese team won its first championship. The second promotion is that of 1996-1997 with the white-starry team that won all the matches on the calendar. The company dissolved the following year, in 1997-1998, at the end of a negative tournament that saw it relegated back to the Third Category.

Tennis

In 1969, the Tennis Club "Pro Loco" Marina di Ginosa was founded, which after more than forty years continues its activity with the tennis starter school and with the traditional national tennis tournament of 3rd and 4th Category. The regular open tournament has been organized since 2013.

== Festivities ==
The patronal feast of Sant'Antonio di Padova is held on 12 and 13 June. Another recurrence felt by the entire community is the Marinese Carnival which, with its allegorical floats and the participation of national-popular guests, takes place both in winter and in summer (the last Sunday of August), starting from Viale Ionio and ending in Piazza Croce Rossa, also known as "Piazza Eventi". Participation is also the feast of San Giuseppe, which every year proposes its traditional bonfire of the Mariners.

== Infrastructures and Transports ==
Marina di Ginosa has a railway station, which acts as the main link between the province of Taranto and the province of Matera.

== See also ==
- Ginosa
