= Stanisław Flato =

Polish Intelligence officer (1910-1972)

- Born: 27 June 1910; Warsaw, Russian Empire
- Died: 2 August 1972 (aged 62); East Berlin
- Education: Warsaw University
- Military career
- Allegiance: Polish People's Republic
- Branch: International Brigades; Polish People's Army
- Service years: 1936-1972
- Rank: Pułkownik (Colonel)
- Units: XIII International Brigade; Department II of the General Staff
- Conflicts: Spanish Civil War; Second World War
- Awards
- Other work: Diplomat

Stanisław (Moishe) Flato (27 June 1910 – 1972) was a Polish army intelligence officer and diplomat.

Born into a Jewish family, he graduated from the gymnasium "Ascola" in Warsaw and enrolled at Warsaw University but finally left to pursue his studies in medicine in Paris. He became a member of the French Communist Party in 1932. Dr. Flato was a volunteer in the Spanish Civil War, became a member of the Spanish Communist Party and served as a Major in the XIII International Brigade, where he remained until February 1939. He was interned in France but that year he was released and went to China in August 1939. He became a member of the Chinese Communist Party, and served as a head of International Red Cross doctors with the People's Liberation Army.

After World War II, he returned to Poland in September 1945. He became a member of the Polish Workers' Party, and the Polish United Workers' Party. Colonel Dr. Flato worked in the Polish General Staff from 1946 to 1952. Then he was arrested (1953-1954). After his political rehabilitation, he served as a Chief Adviser at the Polish Embassy in Beijing from 1957 to 1964, and deputy director at the Department for Asia in Ministry for Foreign Affairs of Poland. After the 1968 Polish political crisis, he was forced to retire, but not allowed to emigrate from Poland. He died in East Berlin during a trip in 1972.

== Awards and decorations ==
- Order of the Banner of Labour, 1st Class
- Order of the Cross of Grunwald, 3rd Class
- Officer's Cross of the Order of Polonia Restituta (17 October 1946)
- Gold Cross of Virtuti Militari (16 July 1946)
