= Palagiano–Chiatona railway station =

Railway station in Palagiano, Italy

Palagiano–Chiatona

General information
- Location: Chiatona, Province of Taranto, Apulia; Italy
- Coordinates: 40°31′01″N 17°03′32″E
- Owner: Rete Ferroviaria Italiana
- Operator: Trenitalia
- Line: Taranto–Reggio di Calabria railway
- Platforms: 2
Location
- Location within Italy Location within Southern Italy Location within Apulia Location within Province of Taranto

Palagiano–Chiatona is a railway station in Chiatona, Italy. The station is located on the Taranto–Reggio di Calabria railway. The train services are operated by Trenitalia.

== Train services ==
The station is served by the following service(s):

- Regional services (Treno regionale) Naples - Salerno - Potenza - Metaponto - Taranto
