= Laterza, Apulia =

Laterza Latèrze (Neapolitan)
- Comune
- Comune di Laterza
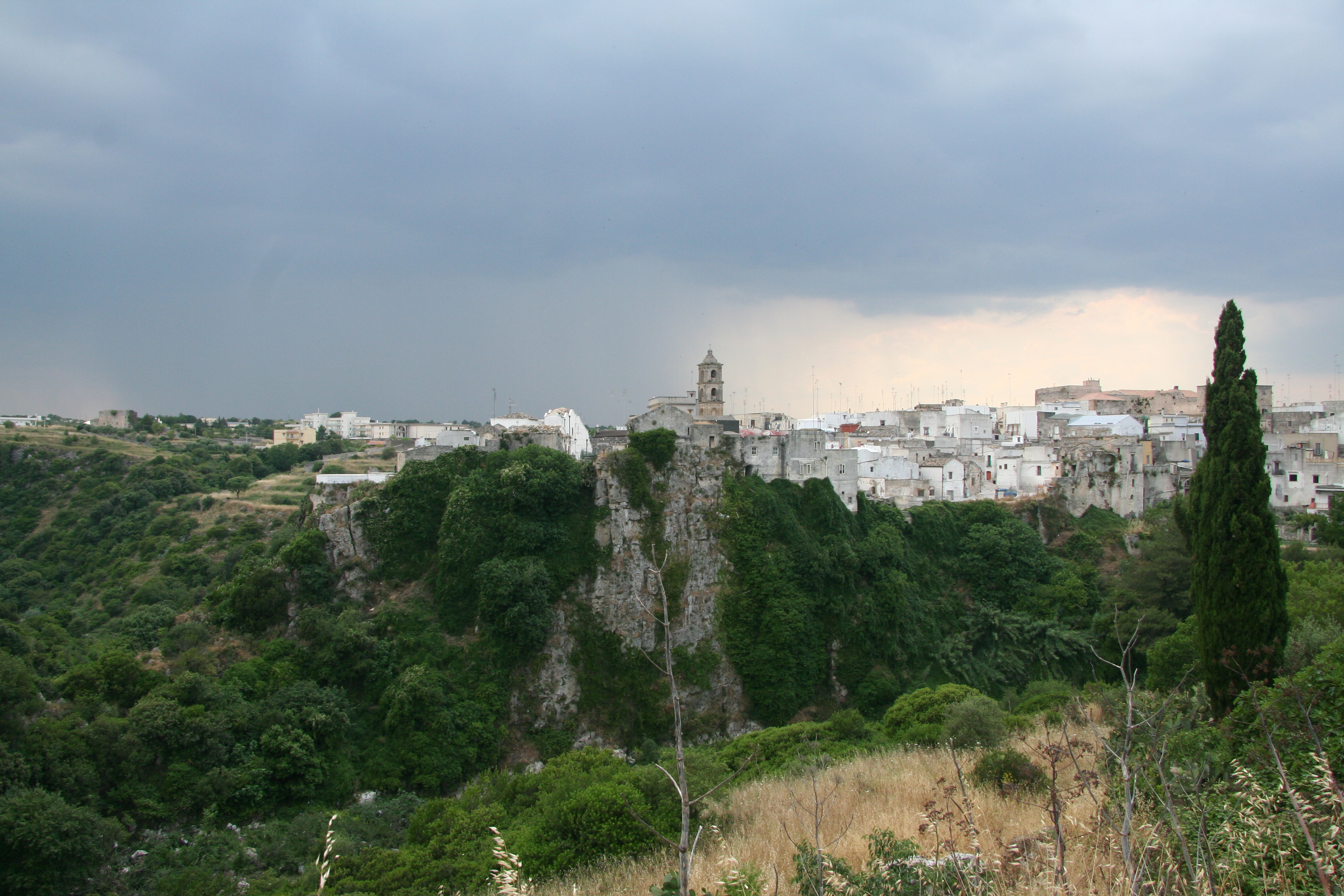
- View of Laterza

- Location within Italy Location within Apulia
- Coordinates: 40°38′N 16°48′E
- Country: Italy
- Region: Apulia
- Province: Taranto (TA)

Government
  - Mayor: Gianfranco Lopane

Area
  - Total: 159 km^{2} (61 sq mi)
- Elevation: 340 m (1,120 ft)

Population (31 August 2017)
  - Total: 15,198
  - Density: 95.6/km^{2} (248/sq mi)
- Demonym: Laertini
- Time zone: UTC+1 (CET)
  - Summer (DST): UTC+2 (CEST)
- Postal code: 74014
- Dialing code: 099
- Patron saint: Maria SS. Mater Domini
- Saint day: May 20
- Website: Official website

Laterza (Italian: [laˈtɛrtsa]; Barese: Latèrze [laˈtɛːrtsə] or ’A Terze [a ˈtɛːrtsə]) is a town and comune in the province of Taranto, part of the Apulia region of southeast Italy.

The Gravina di Laterza, a deep gorge, starts at the southeast edge of the town.

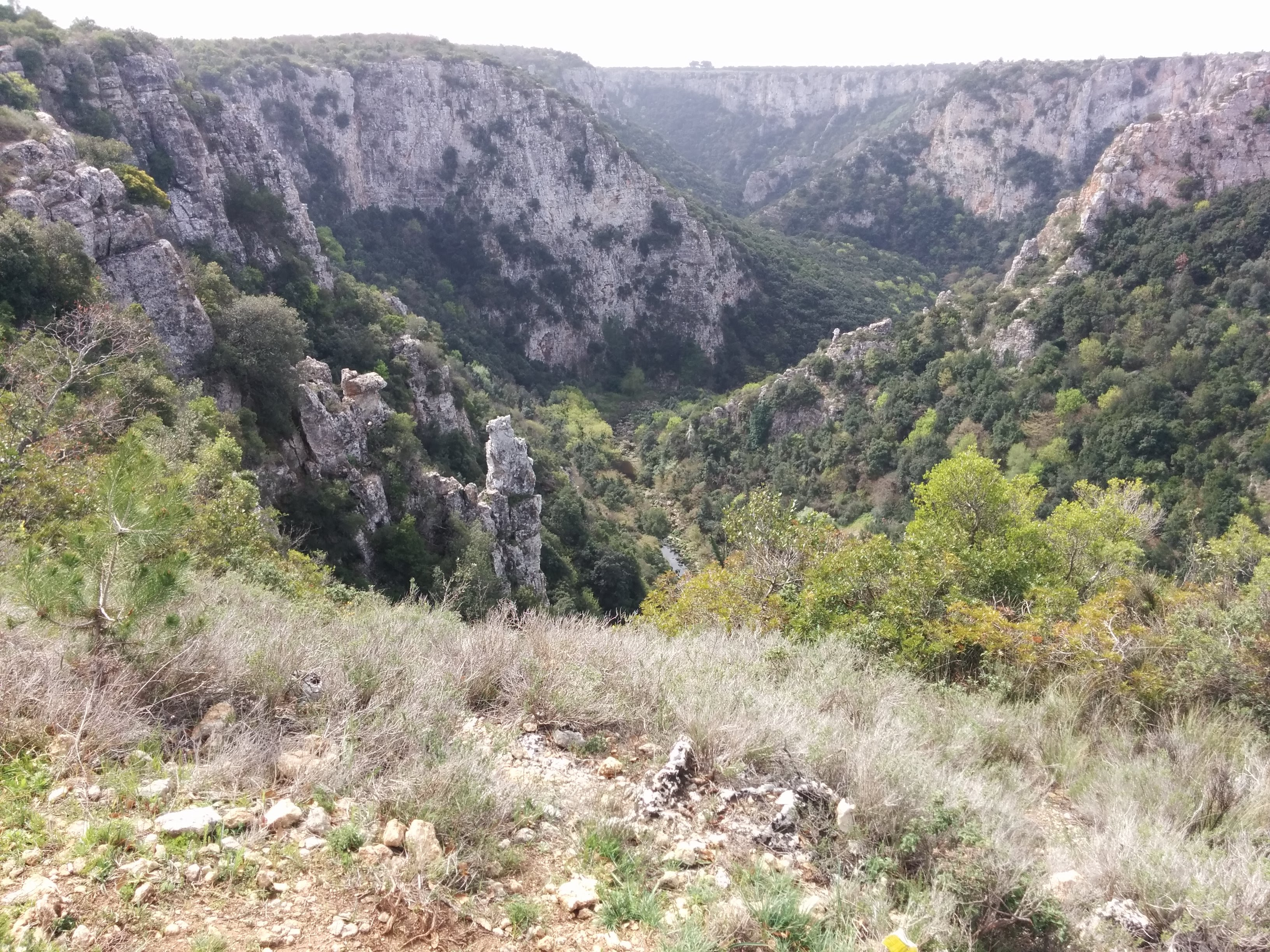

== See also ==
- Laterza culture
- Maiolica di Laterza
- Pane di Laterza
