= Ginosa =

Ginosa Genusìa (Greek)
- Comune
- Comune di Ginosa
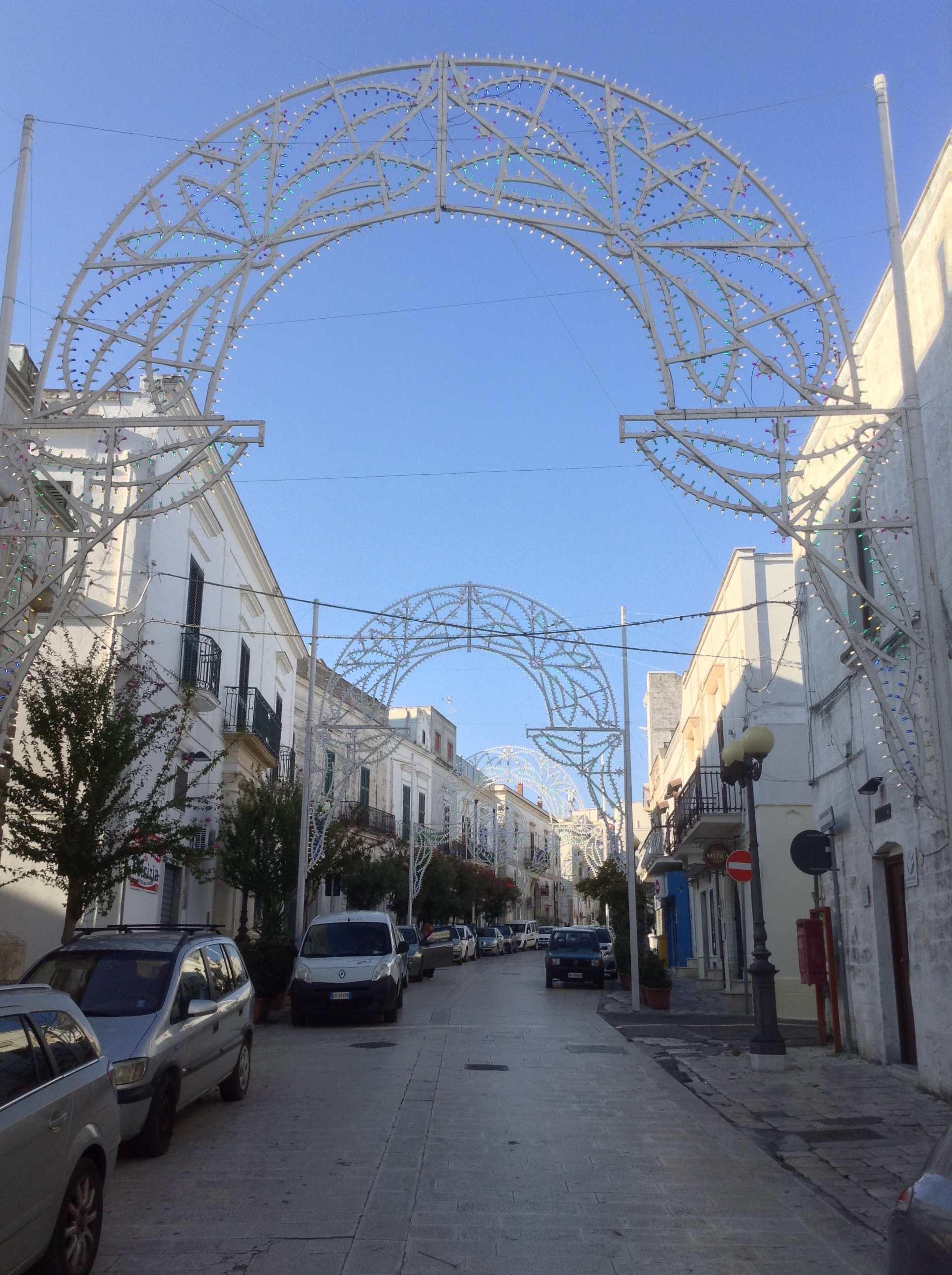
- View of the historical centre

- Coat of arms

- Location in Taranto Province

- Location within Italy Location within Apulia
- Coordinates: 40°30′N 16°45′E
- Country: Italy
- Region: Apulia
- Province: Taranto (TA)
- Frazioni: Marina di Ginosa

Government
  - Mayor: Vito Parisi

Area
  - Total: 188.49 km^{2} (72.78 sq mi)
- Elevation: 240 m (790 ft)

Population (31 August 2017)
  - Total: 22,434
  - Density: 119.02/km^{2} (308.26/sq mi)
- Demonym: Ginosini
- Time zone: UTC+1 (CET)
  - Summer (DST): UTC+2 (CEST)
- Postal code: 74013
- Dialing code: 099
- Patron saint: Madonna of the Rosary
- Saint day: First Sunday in October
- Website: Official website

Ginosa (Barese: Genòse) is a small town and comune in the province of Taranto, Apulia, southern Italy.

== Main sights ==
The most important monument of Ginosa is the Castello Normanno (Norman Castle). It was built in 1080 by Robert Guiscard to defend the city from the invasions of Saracen troops. Originally the castle was adorned by three towers and a drawbridge, all destroyed during the 16th century, when the town became a barony of the Doria family. The castle subsequently became a residential palace and also today overlooks the most ancient area of the town. The castle is also part of the commune's coat of arms.

The Chiesa Madre (mother church) was built in 1554 and is dedicated to Saint Martin of Tours, one of the most popular saints in France. It is a typical southern Italian Baroque style church.

Ginosa is the sight of a famous olive tree, the Thinking Olive Tree, said to be at least 1500 years old, that still produces olives to this day. The thinking tree is famous for its trunk, which has the shape of a face.

== Structures ==
Near Ginosa, there is a 250-metre-tall (820 ft) water tower, nicknamed "Il Missile".

== Climate ==
Marina di Ginosa has a hot-summer mediterranean climate (Köppen Csa). Being in the interior of a bay, the location receives inland heatwaves more frequently than most mediterranean coastlines. This leads to unusually warm coastal days in summer by mainland Italian standards. Rainfall is infrequent, but heavy enough when it arrives to ensure about 500 millimetres (20 in) annually. The municipal seat is likely even hotter in summer due to the relative distance from the coastline.

Climate data for Marina di Ginosa (1991–2020 normals), 12 m asl, extremes since 1967
Month	Jan	Feb	Mar	Apr	May	Jun	Jul	Aug	Sep	Oct	Nov	Dec	Year
Record high °C (°F)	22.4 (72.3)	23.4 (74.1)	28.0 (82.4)	31.2 (88.2)	33.2 (91.8)	43.6 (110.5)	43.4 (110.1)	43.2 (109.8)	39.0 (102.2)	30.4 (86.7)	28.2 (82.8)	22.4 (72.3)	43.6 (110.5)
Mean daily maximum °C (°F)	13.4 (56.1)	14.3 (57.7)	16.7 (62.1)	19.8 (67.6)	24.2 (75.6)	29.4 (84.9)	32.5 (90.5)	32.5 (90.5)	28.0 (82.4)	23.3 (73.9)	18.7 (65.7)	14.5 (58.1)	22.4 (72.3)
Daily mean °C (°F)	9.5 (49.1)	9.9 (49.8)	11.9 (53.4)	14.8 (58.6)	19.2 (66.6)	23.8 (74.8)	26.6 (79.9)	26.8 (80.2)	22.8 (73.0)	18.6 (65.5)	14.4 (57.9)	10.7 (51.3)	17.7 (63.9)
Mean daily minimum °C (°F)	5.8 (42.4)	6.1 (43.0)	8.1 (46.6)	10.7 (51.3)	14.5 (58.1)	18.7 (65.7)	21.3 (70.3)	21.6 (70.9)	18.3 (64.9)	14.6 (58.3)	11.0 (51.8)	7.2 (45.0)	13.4 (56.1)
Record low °C (°F)	−5.0 (23.0)	−2.8 (27.0)	−2.6 (27.3)	−1.8 (28.8)	4.0 (39.2)	7.6 (45.7)	12.0 (53.6)	12.8 (55.0)	8.6 (47.5)	5.0 (41.0)	0.0 (32.0)	−3.0 (26.6)	−5.0 (23.0)
Average precipitation mm (inches)	56.5 (2.22)	34.8 (1.37)	45.7 (1.80)	37.8 (1.49)	29.4 (1.16)	23.1 (0.91)	19.9 (0.78)	18.5 (0.73)	46.6 (1.83)	56.1 (2.21)	74.3 (2.93)	60.1 (2.37)	502.8 (19.8)
Average precipitation days (≥ 1 mm)	6.6	6.1	6.7	6.6	5.6	4.0	1.7	1.7	4.2	5.3	5.8	5.2	59.5
Source: Météo Climat

== See also ==
- Marina di Ginosa
- Lake Salinella
