= Lato (surname) =

Lato is a surname. Notable people with the surname include:

- Danuta Lato (born 1963), Polish model and actress
- Grzegorz Lato (born 1950), Polish footballer
- Jarosław Lato (born 1977), Polish footballer
- Lajos Látó (born 1932), Hungarian cyclist
- Piotr Lato (born 1979), Polish singer
- Stanley J. Lato (1924–2002), American politician
- Toni Lato (born 1997), Spanish footballer
