= Service of the Viscounts of São João da Pesqueira =

20th-century tableware set

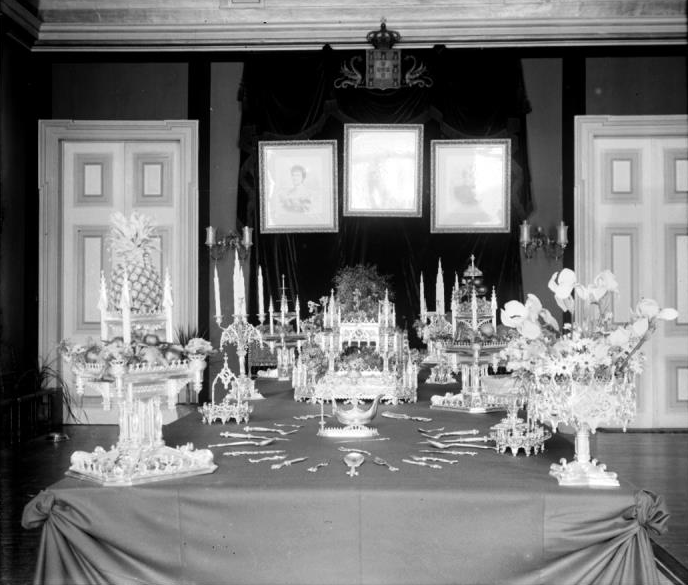
- The service, photographed by Paz dos Reis, 1908
- Material: Silver
- Created: c. 1904, Rafael Bordalo Pinheiro (drawings)

The Service of the Viscounts of São João da Pesqueira is an early 20th-century 300-piece tableware set in cast silver, made in Porto, Portugal, in the Reis & Filhos workshop (jewellers to the King and Queen of Portugal).

The service was commissioned by Luís Maria de Sousa Vaía Rebelo de Morais, 3rd Viscount of São João da Pesqueira (1862–1925), who wished the work reflected a characteristically Portuguese style as a show of appreciation of the national crafts—the pieces were designed in the Neo-Manueline style by Rafael Bordalo Pinheiro, drawing inspiration from the architecture of the 16th-century Monastery of the Hieronymites, in Belém, Lisbon.

Following the commission, the Viscount had the dining room of his palace, the place where he intended to keep the Service on display, completely redecorated and refurbished to match the table set.

The Service currently belongs to the Diocese of Porto. In 2013, the Service was the subject of an exhibit in the Soares dos Reis National Museum, organised by the Catholic University of Portugal for the 4th International Congress on Silver in Ibero-America (La Plata en Iberoamérica).

== Gallery ==
Pieces from the São João da Pesqueira Service
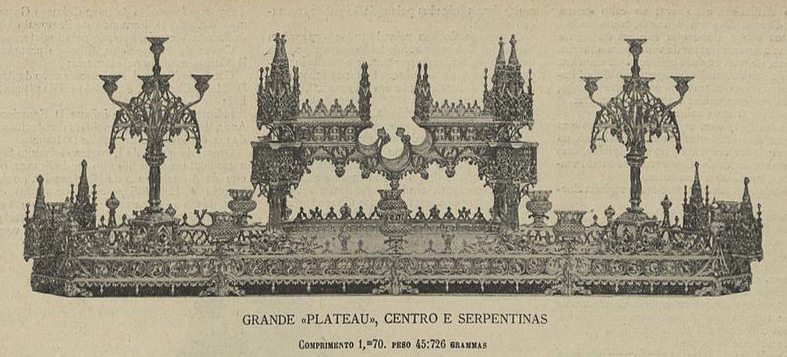
Surtout de table

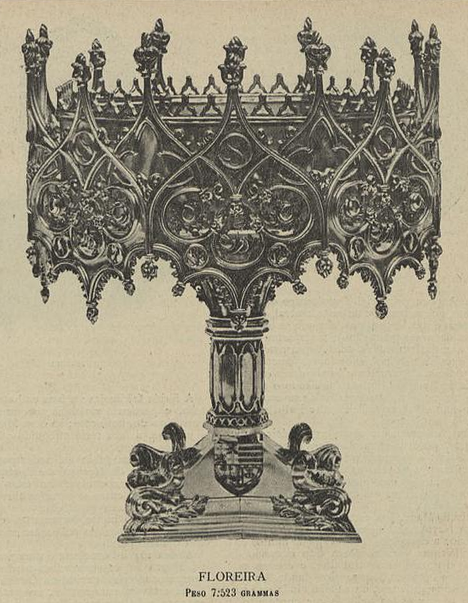
Flower stand

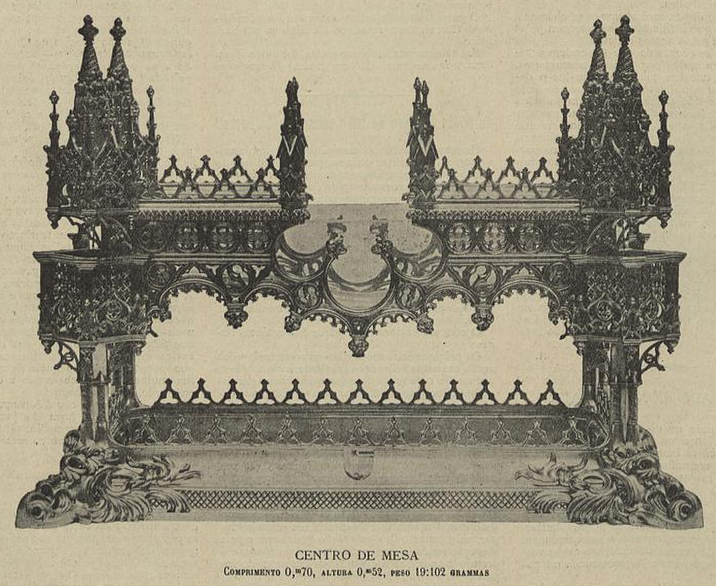
Centrepiece

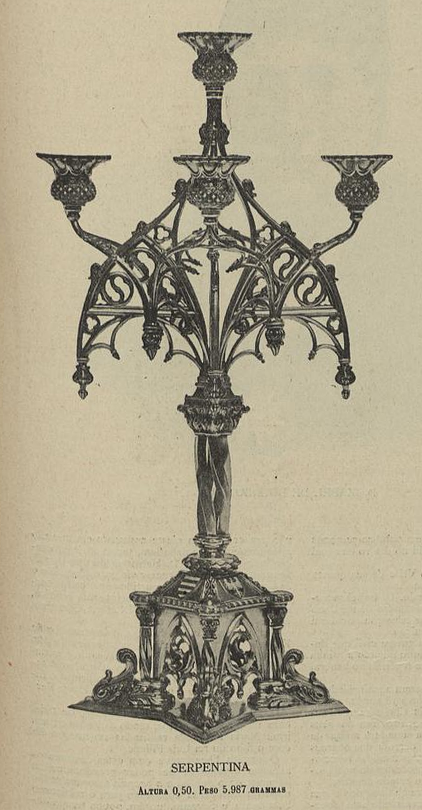
Candelabrum

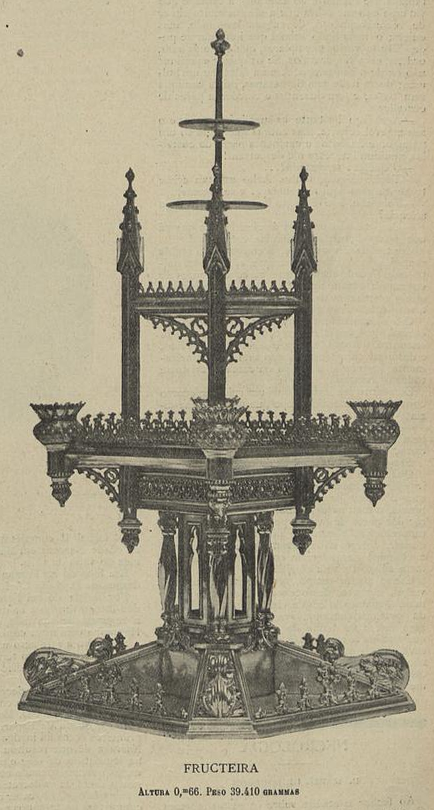
Fruit bowl

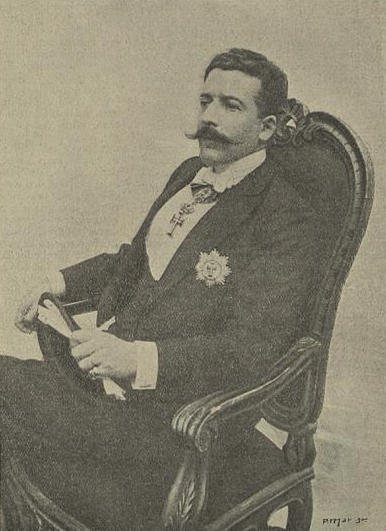
Luís Maria de Sousa Vaía Rebelo de Morais, 3rd Viscount of São João da Pesqueira (1862–1925)

== Bibliography ==
- Reis e Irmão, Joalheiros de SS. Magestades (1904). Uma Baixella Manuelina. Typ. da Empreza Litteraria.
