= Chevenard =

Chevenard is a French surname. Notable people with the surname include:

- Claude-Aimé Chenavard (1797–1838), French artist
- Pierre Chevenard (1888–1960), French metallurgist

== See also ==
- Paul Chenavard (1808–1895), French painter
