= Auguste Ottin =

French sculptor

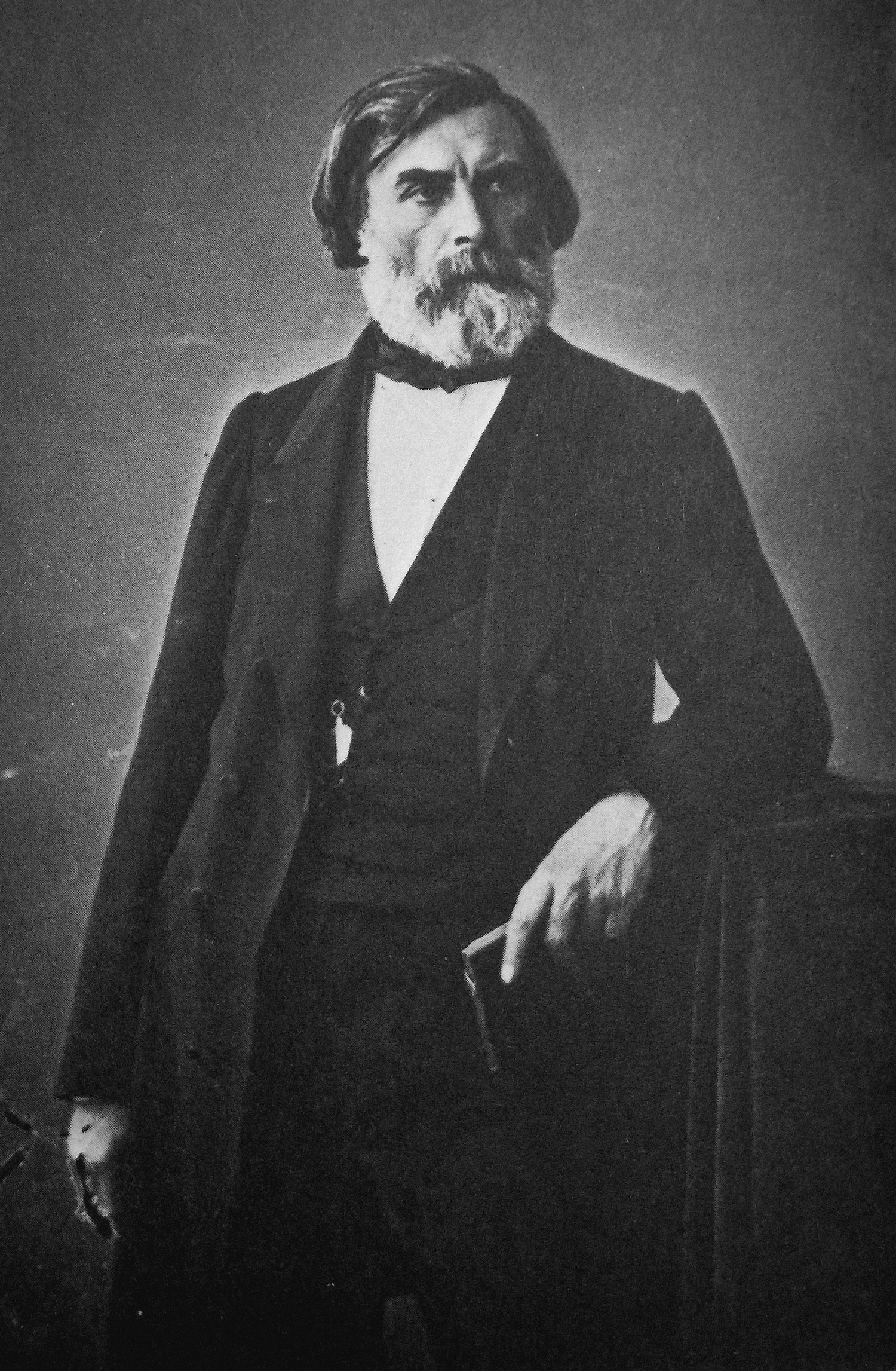
Auguste Ottin, c.1865. Photograph by Nadar

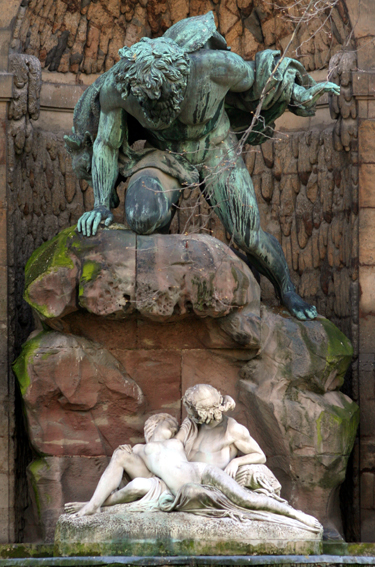
Polyphemus Surprising Acis and Galatea, (1866), the Fontaine Médicis, Jardin du Luxembourg, Paris)

Auguste-Louis-Marie Jenks Ottin (1811–1890) was a French academic sculptor and recipient of the decoration of the Legion of Honor.

== Early life ==
Ottin was born and died in Paris, where he was a pupil of David d'Angers and of the École des Beaux Arts. Ottin was a friend of Théodore Chassériau, a pupil in the atelier of Ingres, who in 1833 produced a black chalk portrait of Ottin. (Presented to the National Gallery of Art, Washington, in 2006.) Ottin obtained the Grand Prix de Sculpture at the Concours of 1836 with his statue of "Socrate Buvant la Ciguë.".

== Exhibitions ==
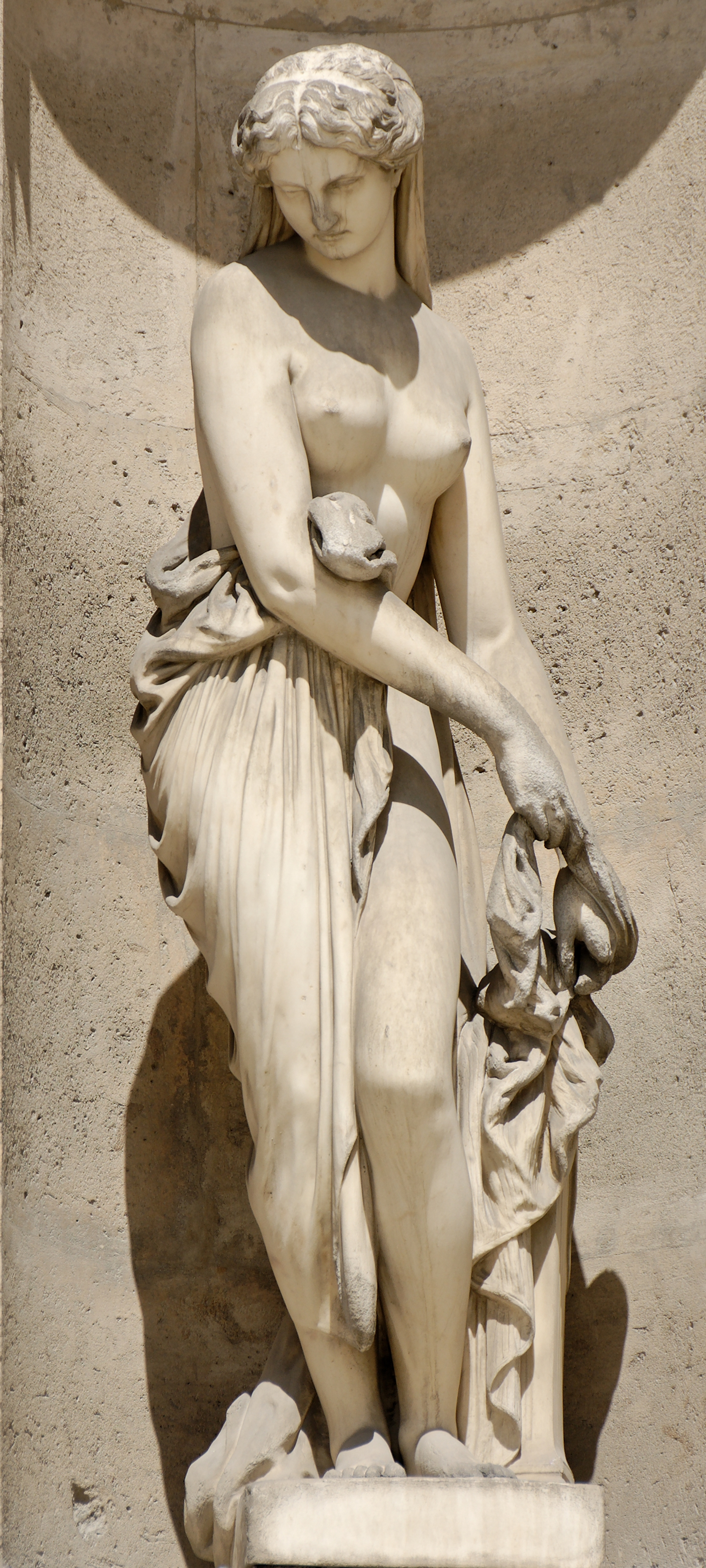
Campaspe Taking off Her Clothes in Front of Apelles by Order of Alexander (1883). North façade of the Cour Carrée in the Louvre palace, Paris.

Ottin was responsible for the assembly in 1834 of the vast surtout de table of hunting vignettes, commissioned for the Tuileries Garden by Louis-Philippe's heir, Ferdinand-Philippe, duc d'Orléans, and entrusted to the supervision of Claude-Aimé Chenavard, who gave much of the sculptural work to Antoine-Louis Barye, the celebrated animalier. In 1836 he shared with Jean-Marie Bonnassieux the Grand Prix de Rome for a sculpture of Socrates drinking the draft. One vestige of his Roman sojourn of 1836-1840 is a View of Rome, 1837, in graphite and watercolor, at the Fine Arts Museums of San Francisco.

His portrait bust of the painter and Director of the Academy, Jean-Auguste-Dominique Ingres, executed shortly after his return to Paris in 1840, in plaster, tinted terracotta, is conserved by the École nationale supérieure des Beaux-Arts, Paris.

Ottin exhibited in 1841 a bust in marble, and afterward produced a group of "Hercules Presenting to Eurysthea the Apples of Hesperides," in marble; busts of Chaptal, Quesnault, Ingres, (1842); and Ecce Homo, in marble, (1844). His 1846 "Indian Hunter Surprised by a Boa" in bronze resulted in the awarding of a medal and was a featured piece under the center dome of the New York Crystal Palace in 1853, and was later mounted at Fontainebleau Chateau outside Paris.

His Travail manuel is at the Louvre Museum. Ottin's Laure de Noves (1850), Petrarch's Laura, is one of a series of Queens of France and historical ladies that had been commissioned for the Jardin du Luxembourg under Louis-Philippe.

About the same time he was commissioned to provide the sculptural elements for a room in an old palazzo in Florence, via de’ Renai, that was designed as an homage to the social utopian Charles Fourier by an admirer of his philosophy, François Sabatier-Unger, who had recently wed the palazzo's owner, the Austrian singer, Caroline Unger.

During the Second Empire, he executed a full-length official sculpture of Napoleon III, which is still at Compiègne. In 1866 he was commissioned to provide a sculptural centrepiece for the Medici Fountain in the Jardin du Luxembourg, one of the few survivals of Salomon de Brosse's gardens for Marie de Medici; the nymphaeum of rockwork in an architectural frame was being moved from its former location to make way for widening of a carriageway, part of Baron Haussmann's improvements. The result was his best-known work, Polyphemus Surprising Acis and Galatea, where the bronze giant crouches above the rocky grotto in which Galatea lies in the arms of Acis, who leans on his elbow in the manner of a river god—which he is just about to become: see Acis. His Pan and Diana in marble accompany the group.

In the new Square Emile-Chautemps at Le Sentier, Paris IIIème, among the sculptural figures enhancing two oval pools under the general artistic direction of Gabriel Davioud, Ottin was entrusted with seated bronze figures of Mercury and Music.

In the extensive sculptural programme of the Palais Garnier for the Opera, Ottin was entrusted with La Musique and La Danse seated figures leaning on a central medallion in the arched pediment on the west-facing facade. He also provided standing females representing northern French cities for the less-demanding programme of the Gare du Nord Among similar commissions are his statues of Euthymenes and Pytheas for the Bourse, Marseille.
