= Euthymenes =

Greek explorer (sixth century BCE)

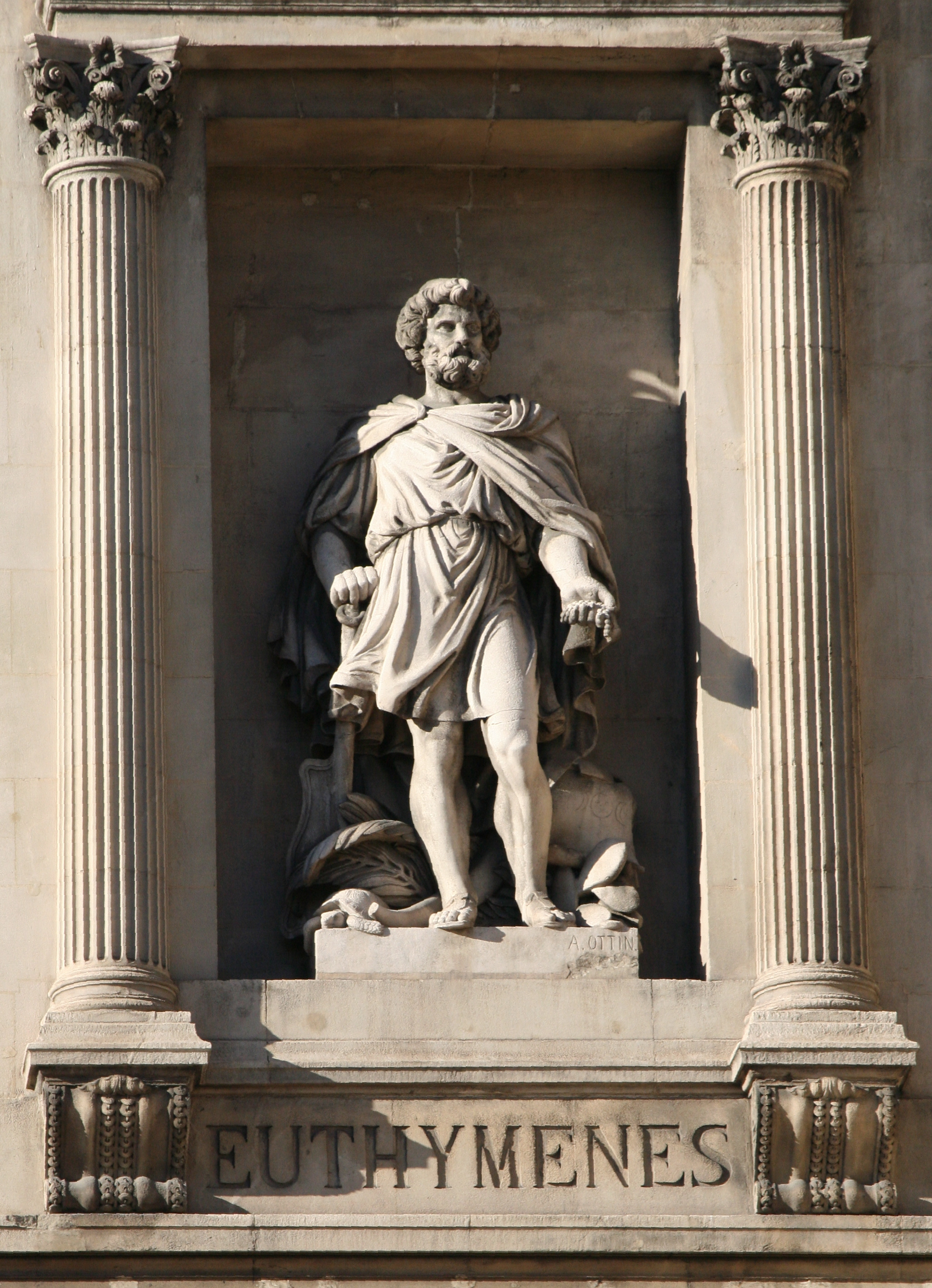
- The statue of Euthymenes (by Auguste Ottin) on the façade of the Palais de la Bourse, Marseille
- Born: Massilia (Marseille)

Euthymenes of Massalia (/juːˈθɪməniːz/; Ancient Greek: Εὐθυμένης ὁ Μασσαλιώτης Euthymenēs ho Massaliōtēs; fl. early sixth century BCE) was a Greek explorer from Massalia (modern Marseille), who explored the coast of West Africa as far, apparently, as a great river, of which the outflow made the sea at its mouth fresh or brackish.

His published accounts have not survived, but seem to have been known, at least at secondhand, by Plutarch, who writes "Euthymenes the Massilian concludes that the Nile is filled by Oceanus and that sea which is outward from it, the latter being naturally sweet." Euthymenes thought that this river was the Nile, but the river in question may have been the Senegal.

Seneca the Younger also knew Euthymenes' account, which he reported in Naturales quaestiones (iv.2.22) and refuted, for various reasons:

Euthymenes of Massilia says by way of testimony, 'I have navigated' says he, 'the Atlantic sea. Now, the Nile flows, greatly, as long as the Etesian Winds endure; for the sea is constantly thrown back by the constant winds; as soon as they have abated and the sea becomes calm, the Nile descends with less force. For the rest, the seawater is fresh to the taste and has wildlife similar to that of the Nile.

The statue of Euthymenes (by Auguste Ottin) is featured on the façade of the Marseille bourse along with the one of Pytheas.
