= Surtout de table =

Dining table centerpiece

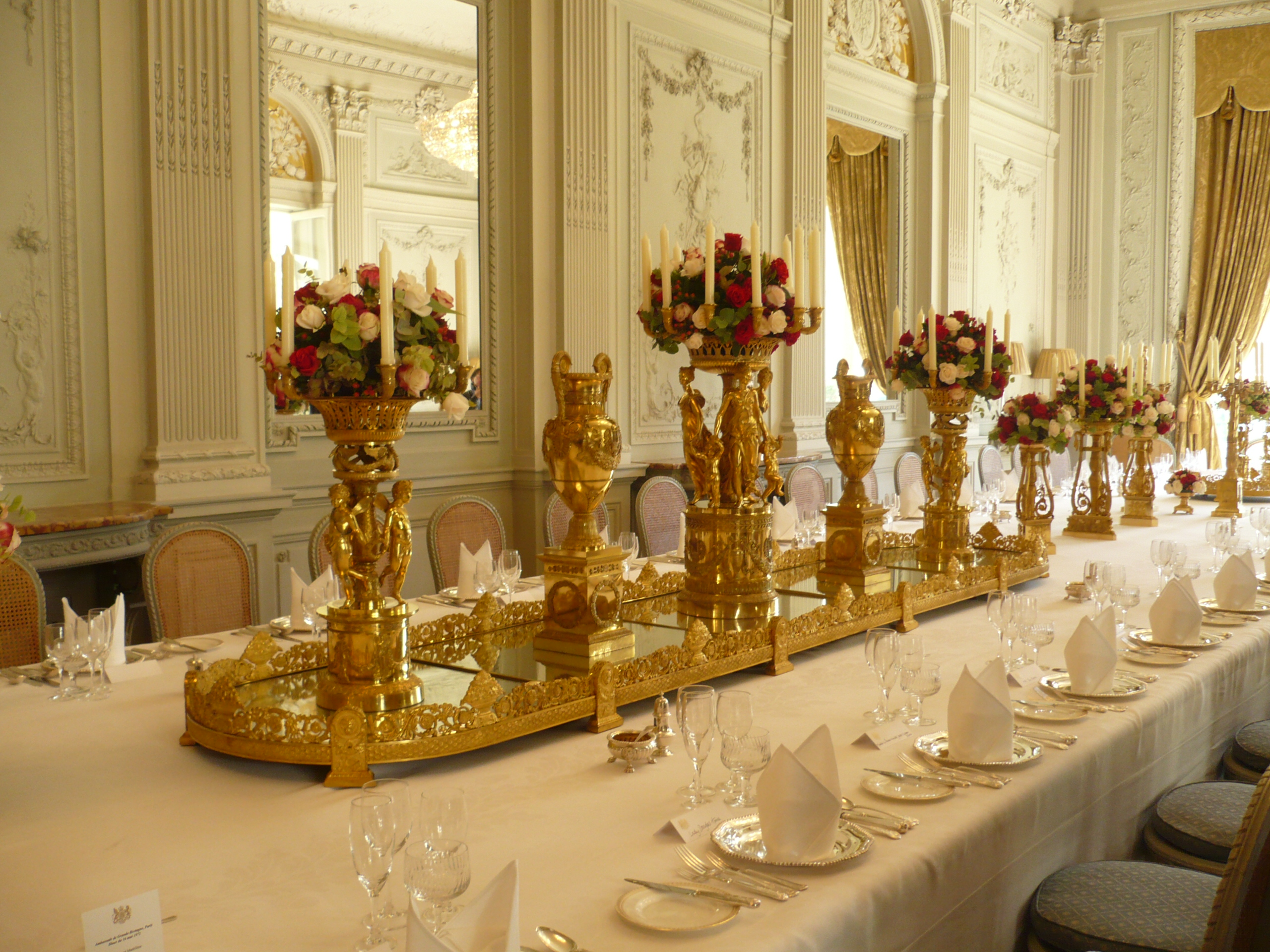
Surtout de table at the hôtel de Charost; the top is a mirror.

A surtout de table is an ornamental centrepiece displayed on a formal dining table, "a large centerpiece with mirrored plateaus and numerous candelabra and other possible display pieces on top". In French surtout de table is the usual term for any type of centrepiece, but in English this "tray" type, along with the objects placed on it, is the usual meaning.

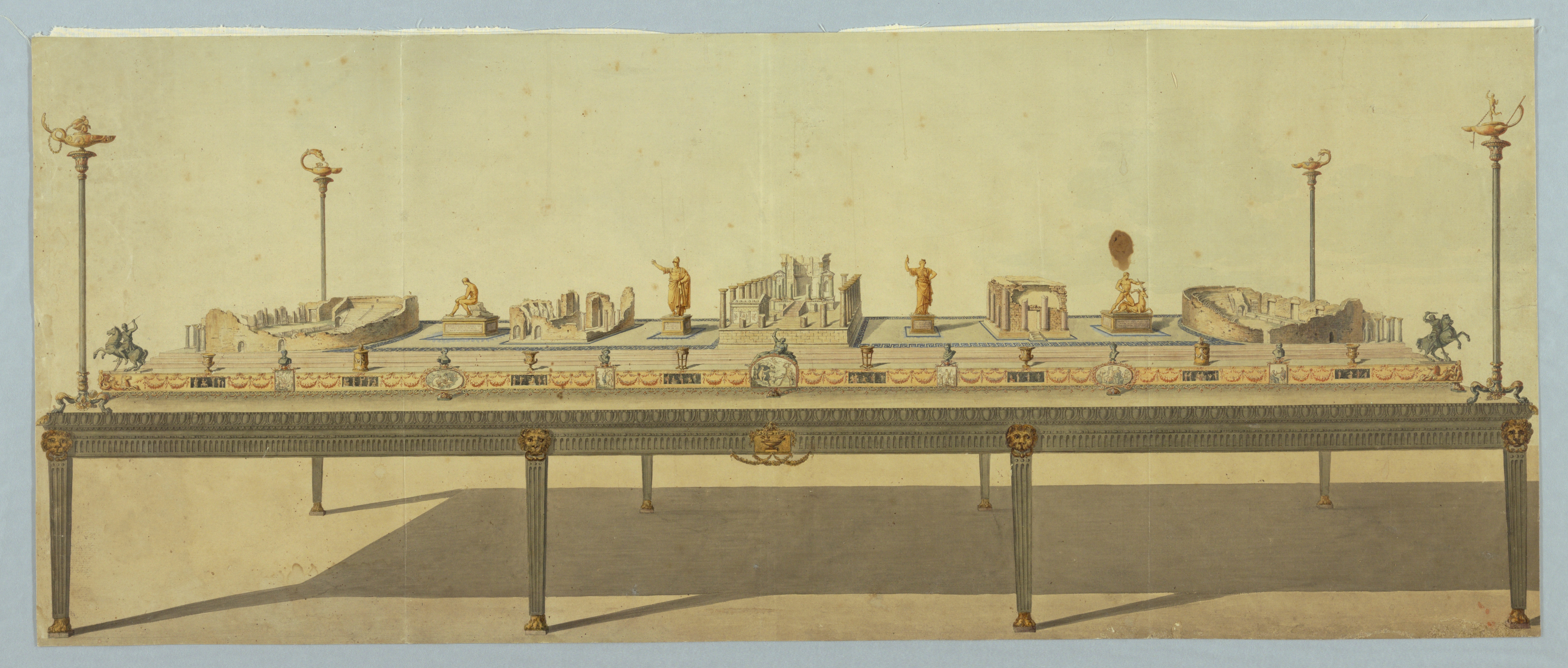
Drawing, Design for a Surtout de Table based on Pompeii, 1780–90

Evolving from a simple plate or bowl on which to stand candlesticks and condiments, a surtout de table often took the form of a long galleried tray made of precious or gilded metals, on which a series of other objects were placed for display. It was often made in sections allowing its length to be determined by the leaves added to the table. During the later half of the 18th century and throughout the 19th century, no formal table was considered compete without one. Today, they are still seen and used in the most formal dining rooms.

== History ==
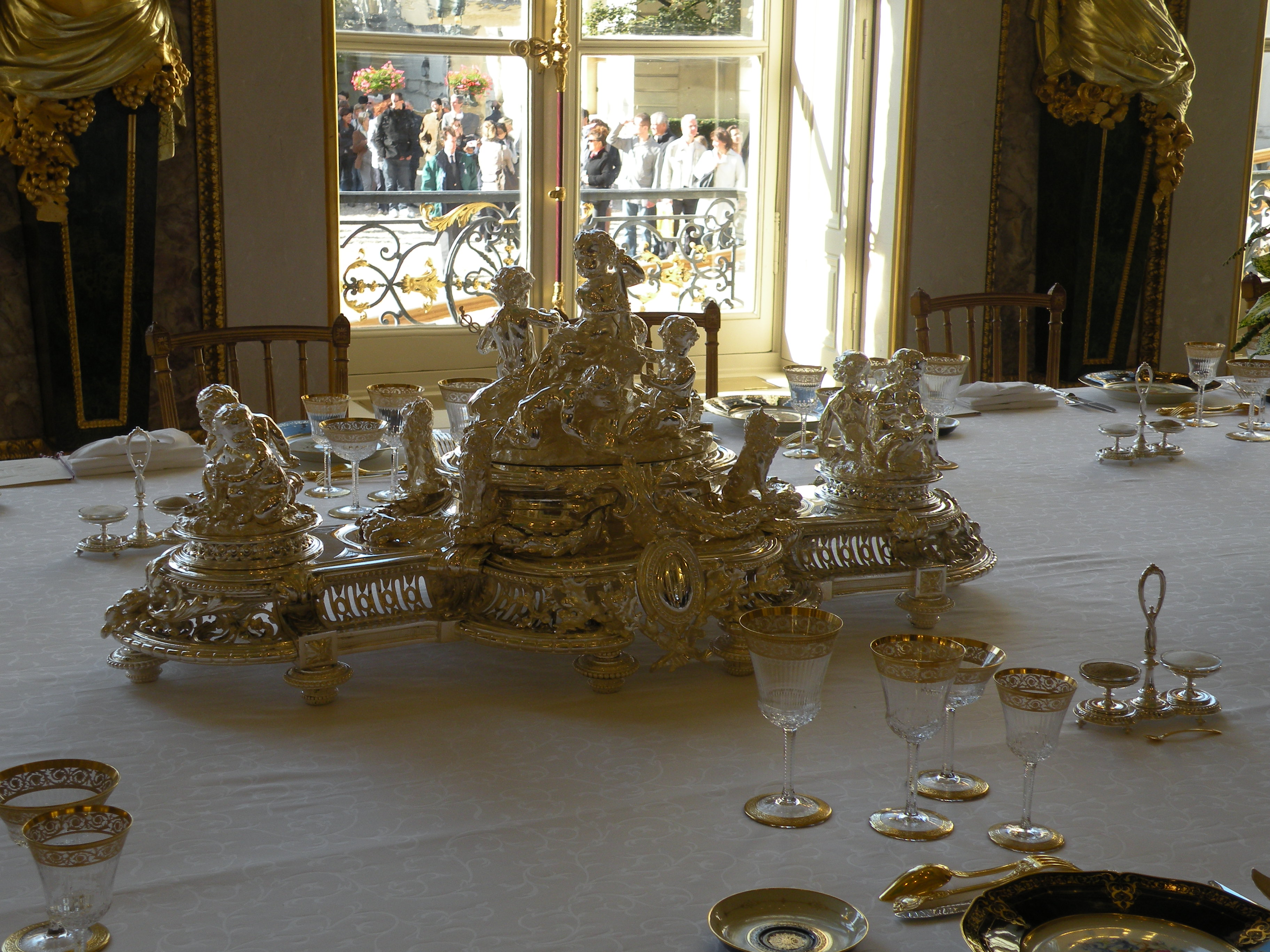
Palais Bourbon

According to Roy Strong, the surtout de table first appeared in 1692 at the meals for the wedding of Philippe II, Duke of Orléans (then duc de Chartres) and Louis XIV's legitimized daughter Françoise Marie de Bourbon, as "a great silver gilt piece of a new invention". At first it was designed to hold candles, condiments, and other clutter on the table, and protect a polished wooden table from the staining caused by spillage from the salt and vinegars in the condiments. During the first half of the 18th century, as the great central and ceremonial salt cellars fell from favour, to be replaced by smaller individual salt cellars, and the sugar sculpture trionfo declined, the surtout de table evolved to fill the role of ornamental table centrepiece.

It often took the form of a raised galleried tray which would be filled with matching candelabra, figurines, vases and epergnes, the gallery itself sometimes containing candle sconces. They were not always constructed from precious metals; porcelain and glass were often used, as might be sculptures made from sugar. The top of the tray was often a mirror, to show the underside of the objects on it, and increase reflected light. Others continued as sculptural forms, sometimes becoming extremely extravagant.

It was not uncommon, if a surtout de table were commissioned for a specific house, for an indigenous theme to be used in the style. Hence, a hunting lodge may have a surtout de table with figurines of dogs and their quarry while a grander town palace would feature the most fashionable Rococo or Baroque styles of the day. Military figures and regimental officers' messes often commissioned examples with military subjects.

During the 1850s, the fashion for themed dining table decoration reached its apogee and the surtout de table reflected this. Porcelain factories such as Meissen produced elaborate models and figurines which replaced the classical statuary of the Empire style with coloured porcelain mountains, rustic scenes with cattle and goats and, occasionally, even a jungle theme complete with lifelike porcelain snakes.

== Notable examples ==
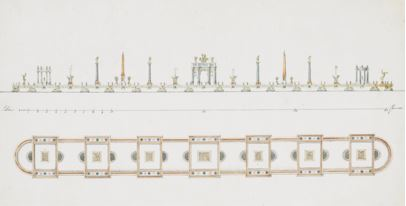
Design for a classical architectural surtout de table by Giuseppe Valadier

Notable examples of surtouts de table include those made the Italian goldsmith Luigi Valadier, often designed by his son, the architect Giuseppe Valadier. These monumental surtouts de table often represent Roman cities in miniature, complete with temples, colonnades and triumphal arches of coloured marbles and alabaster mounted on gold and mosaic pediments.

Waddesdon Manor in England is now home to a vast 6.7 metre long gilt tray surtout de table made by Pierre-Philippe Thomire (1751–1843). Made circa 1818, it was given to Prince Ruffo della Scaletta by Louis XVIII.

George Washington ordered one via Gouverneur Morris in Paris in 1790, writing "Will you please my good Sir, send to me to Philadelphia or this place mirrors for a table with neat and fashionable but not expensive, ornaments for them, such as will do credit to your taste. The mirrors, the aggregate length of them may be ten feet, the width two feet, the panels may be plated ware or anything else more fashionable."

France distributing wreaths of glory is the name and theme of a large silver plate on bronze surtout de table commissioned from the Parisian jeweller Charles Christofle by Napoleon III in 1852. Intended for use at state banquets at the Tuileries Palace, the gilded tray contains a garniture of fifteen sculptures. The central figure is a winged Victory bearing laurel leaves which she awards to two horse-drawn chariots representing war and peace. At Victory's feet sit figurines representing Justice, Concord, Force and Religion.

The surtout de table was still in situ when the palace caught fire in 1871. It was pulled from the smoking debris damaged but intact. It has never been restored and is today displayed with its smoke-blackened gilt and dents at the Musée des Arts Décoratifs in Paris.

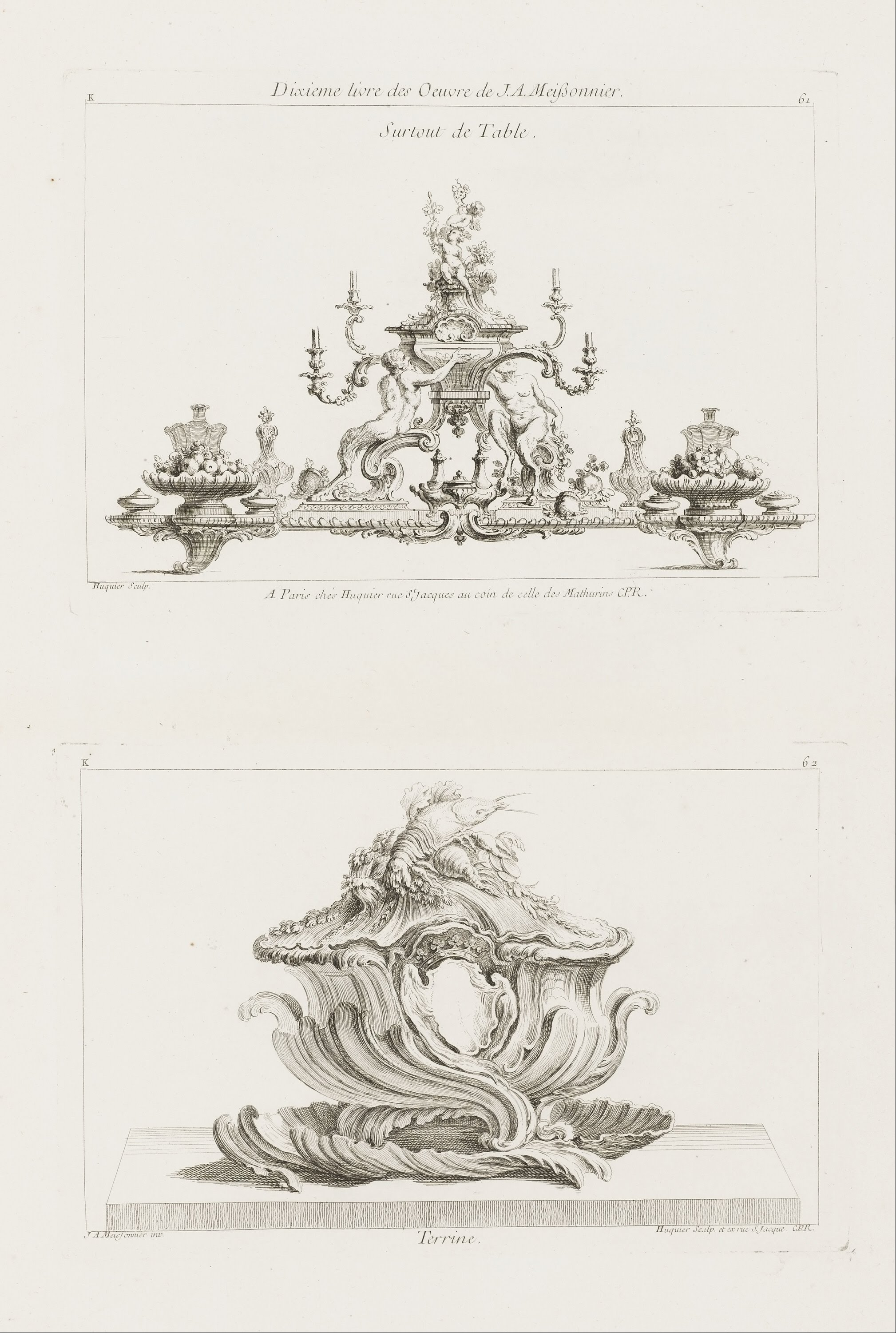
Designs for silver, Juste-Aurèle Meissonnier, 1740s

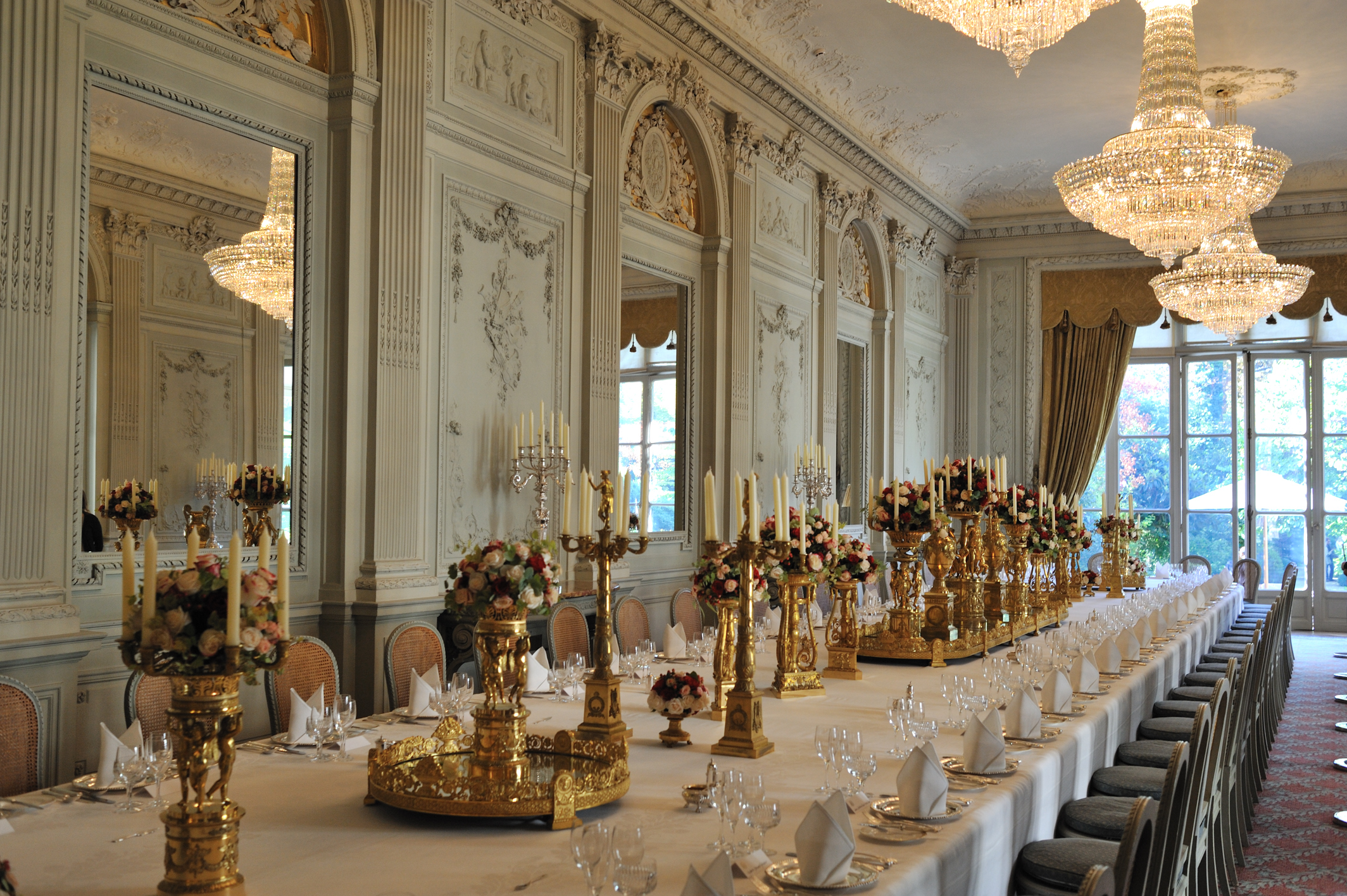
Hôtel de Charost

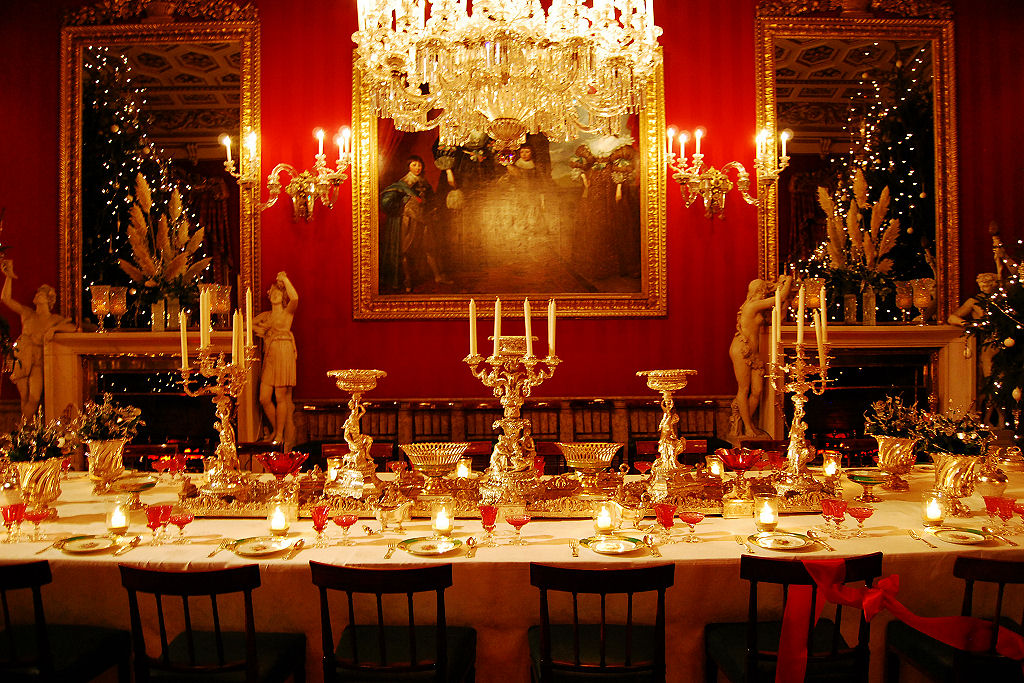
Chatsworth House

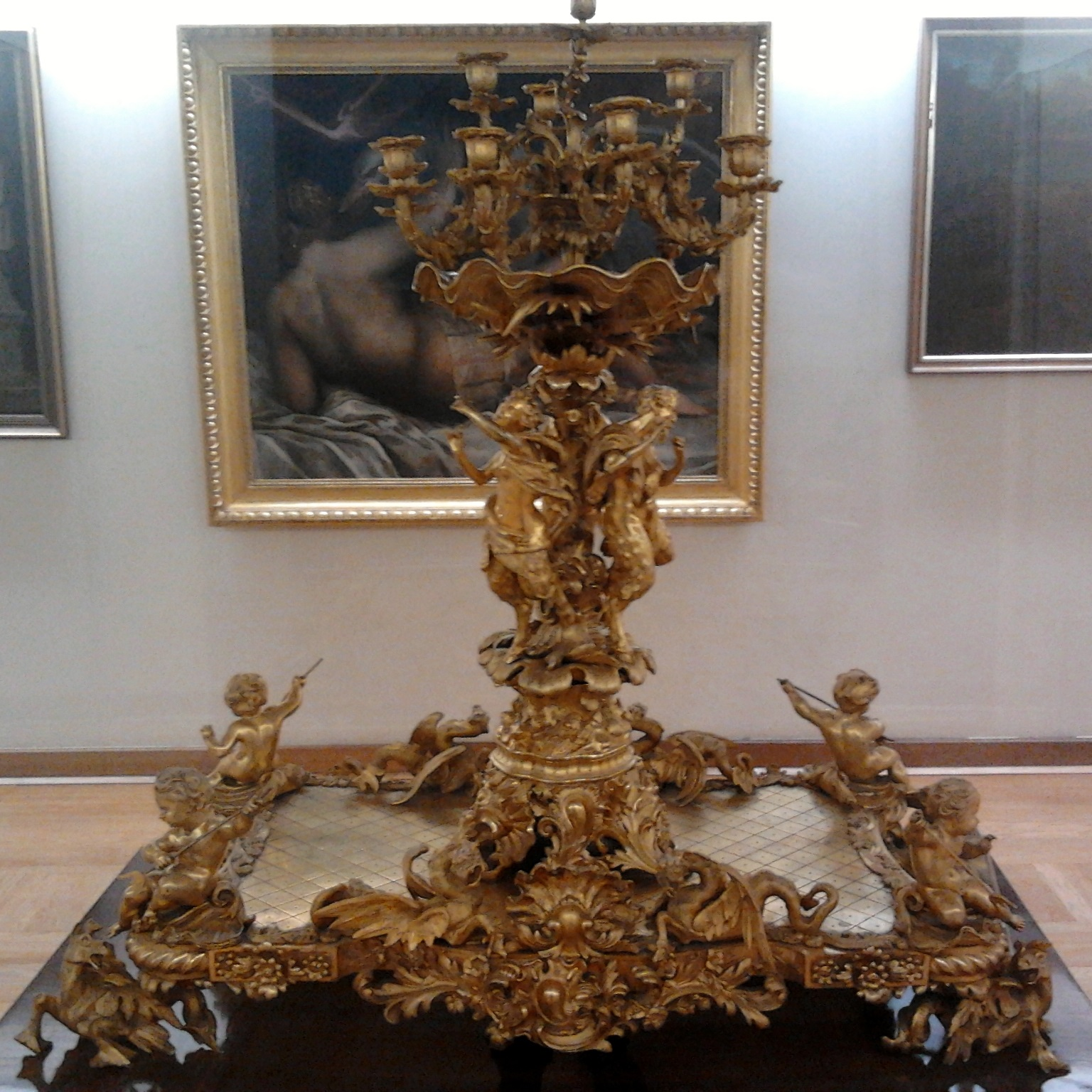
French ormolu, later 19th century

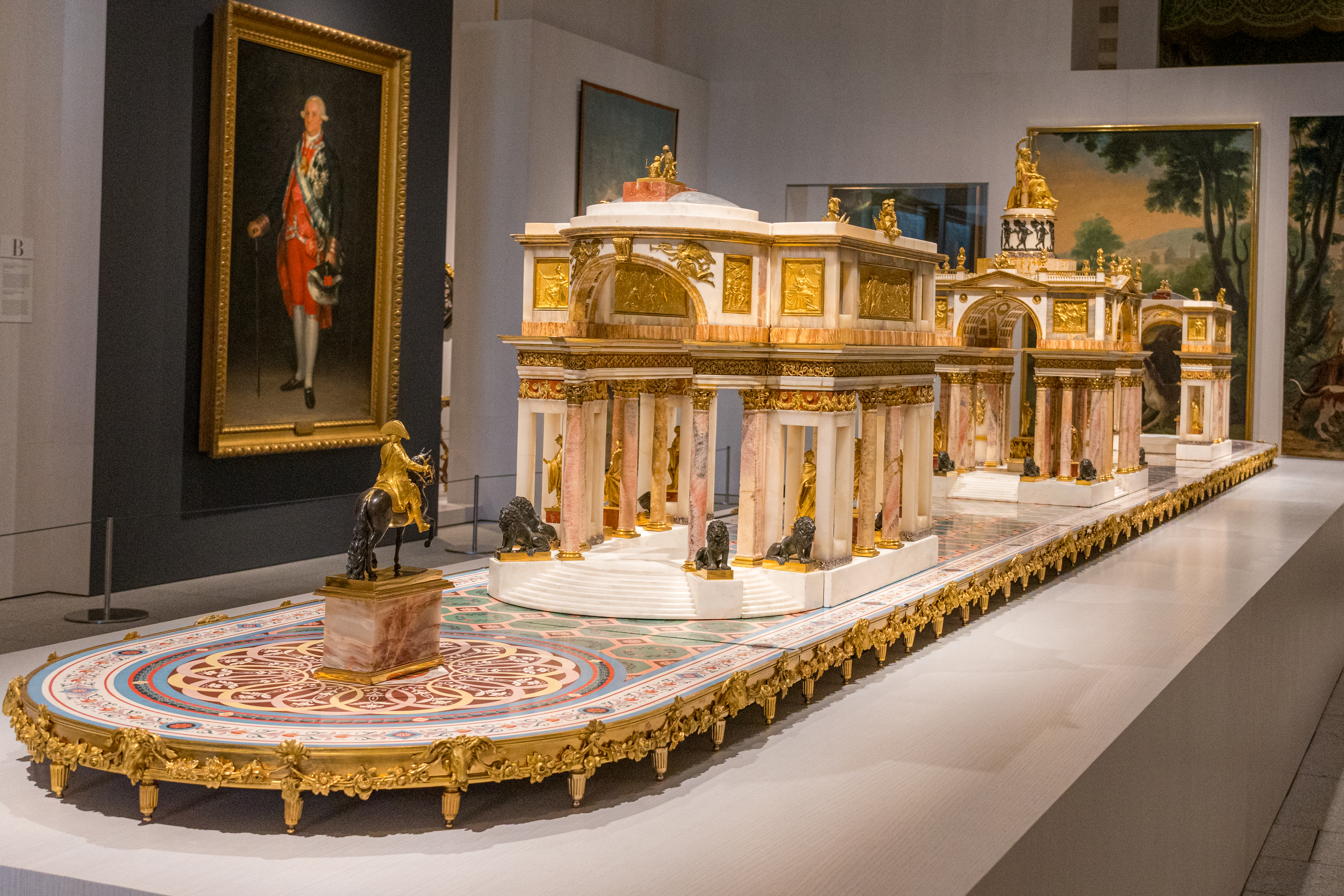
Glories of Spain, 1802. Royal Collections Gallery
