= Centrepiece =

Decorative object on a table

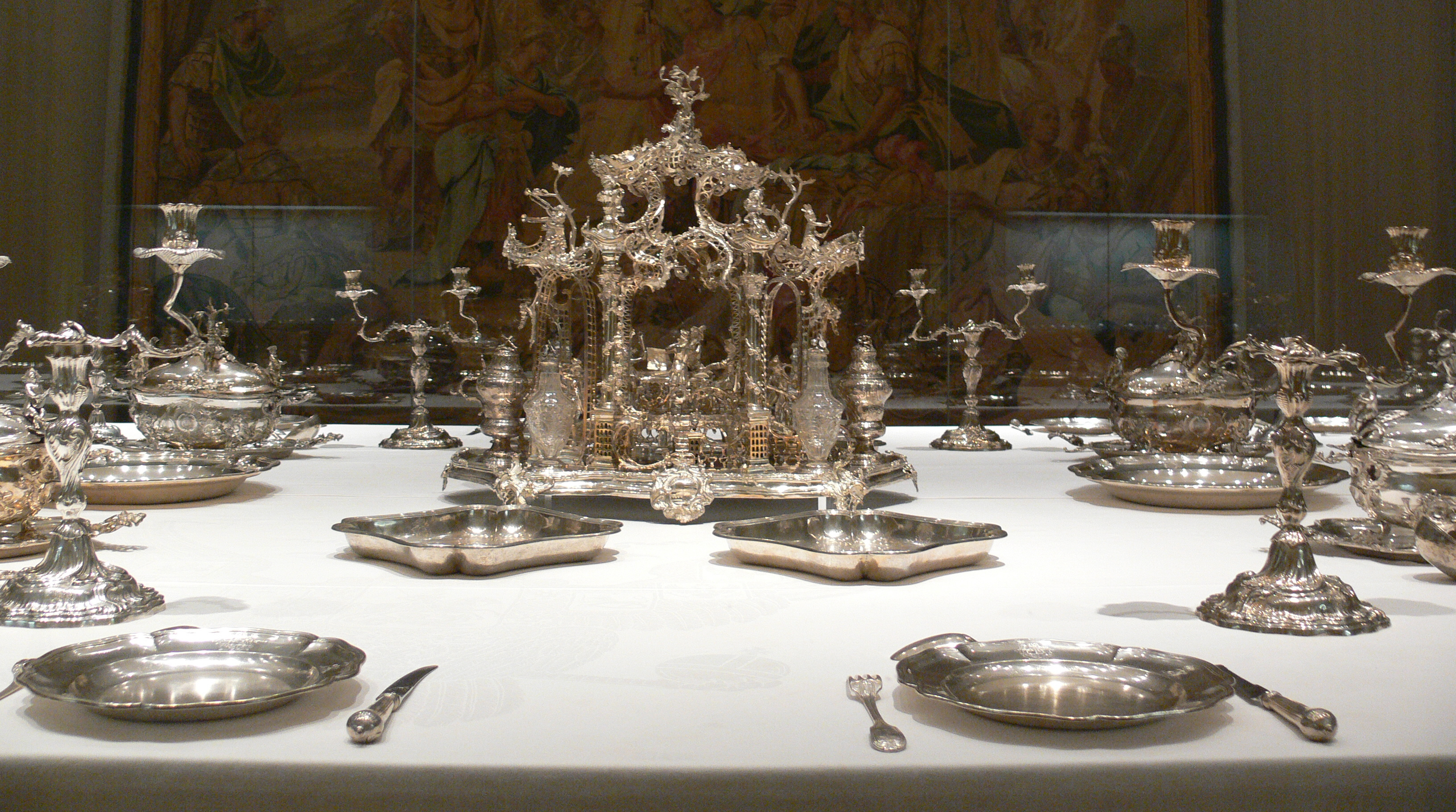
Rococo silver centrepiece of the Prince-Bishop of Hildesheim, 1763

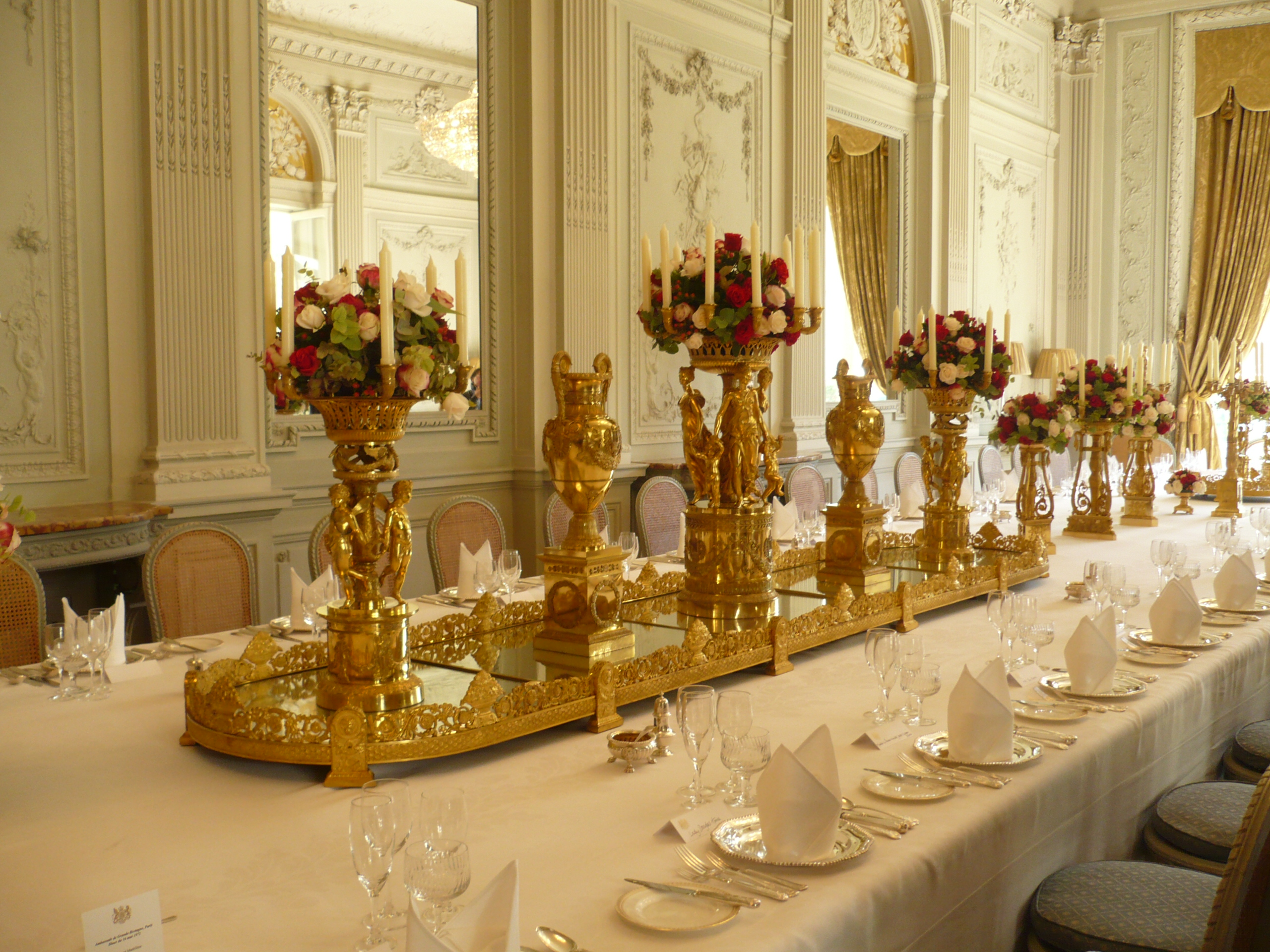
A surtout de table tray centrepiece at the Hôtel de Charost, home of the ambassador of Great Britain, Paris

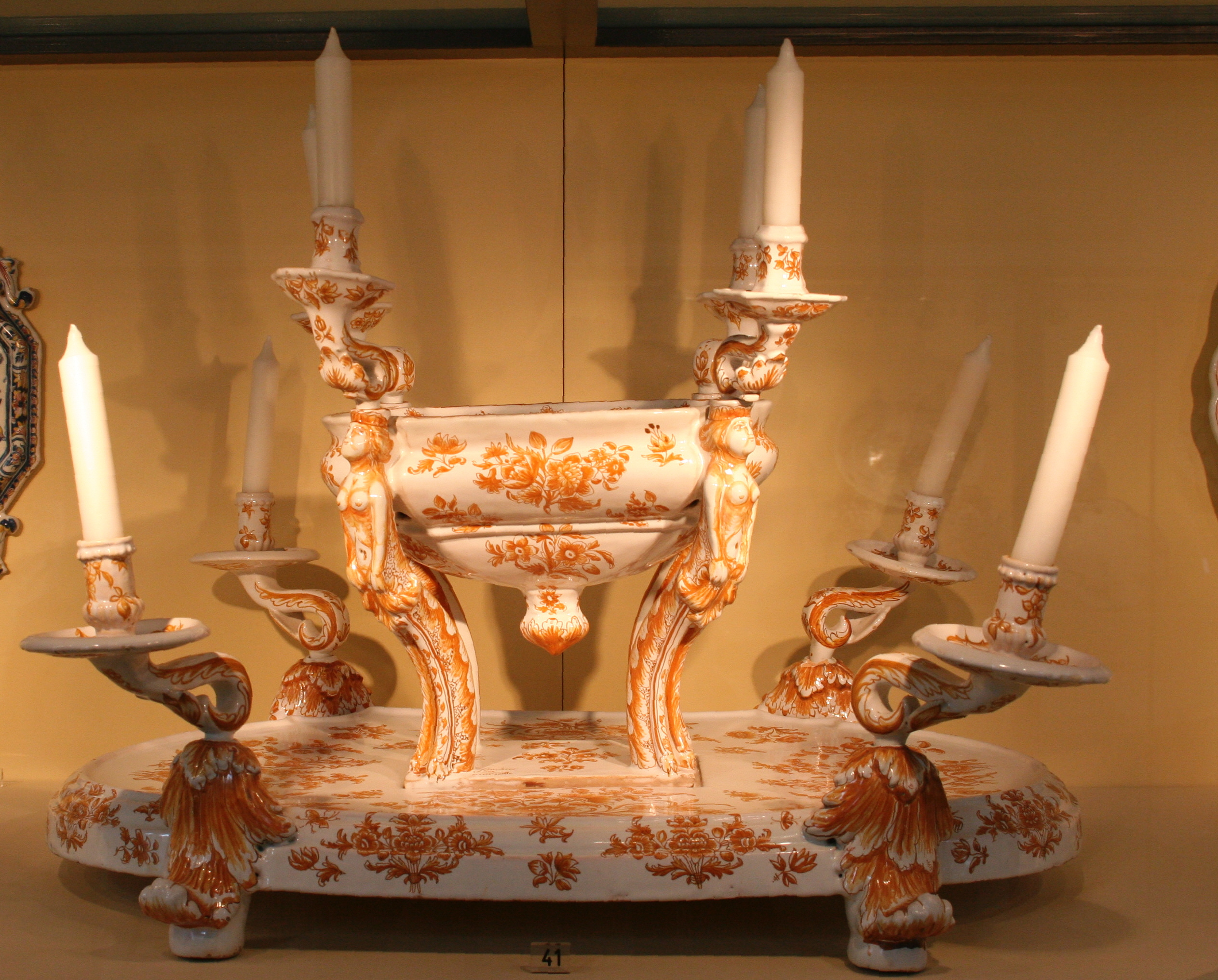
Joseph Fauchier, c. 1760, Musée de la Faïence de Marseille

A centrepiece or centerpiece is an important item of a display, usually of a table setting. Centrepieces help set the theme of the decorations and bring extra decorations to the room. A centrepiece also refers to any central or important object in a collection of items.

Traditional types for the very formal dining table include the epergne, with branching arms ending in bowls, and the surtout de table, in English reserved for a long tray, often with mirrors as the surface, on which candles, sculptures and other objects are placed.

== Purpose ==
On the table, a centrepiece is a central object which serves a decorative purpose. However, centrepieces are often not too large, to avoid difficulty with visibility around the table and to allow for the easier serving of dishes.

Other centrepieces are often made from flowers, candles, fruit, or candy.

Centrepieces are a major part of the decoration for a wedding reception, being used widely at wedding receptions with flowers being the most popular form of centrepieces. Weddings, baby showers, engagement parties, anniversary parties and birthdays often have some form of centrepiece.

Formal functions in Europe can sometimes have very elaborate centrepieces, which can span the entire length of the table.

At holiday times, including Valentine's Day, Easter, Halloween, Thanksgiving, and Christmas, homes are often decorated with holiday centrepieces.

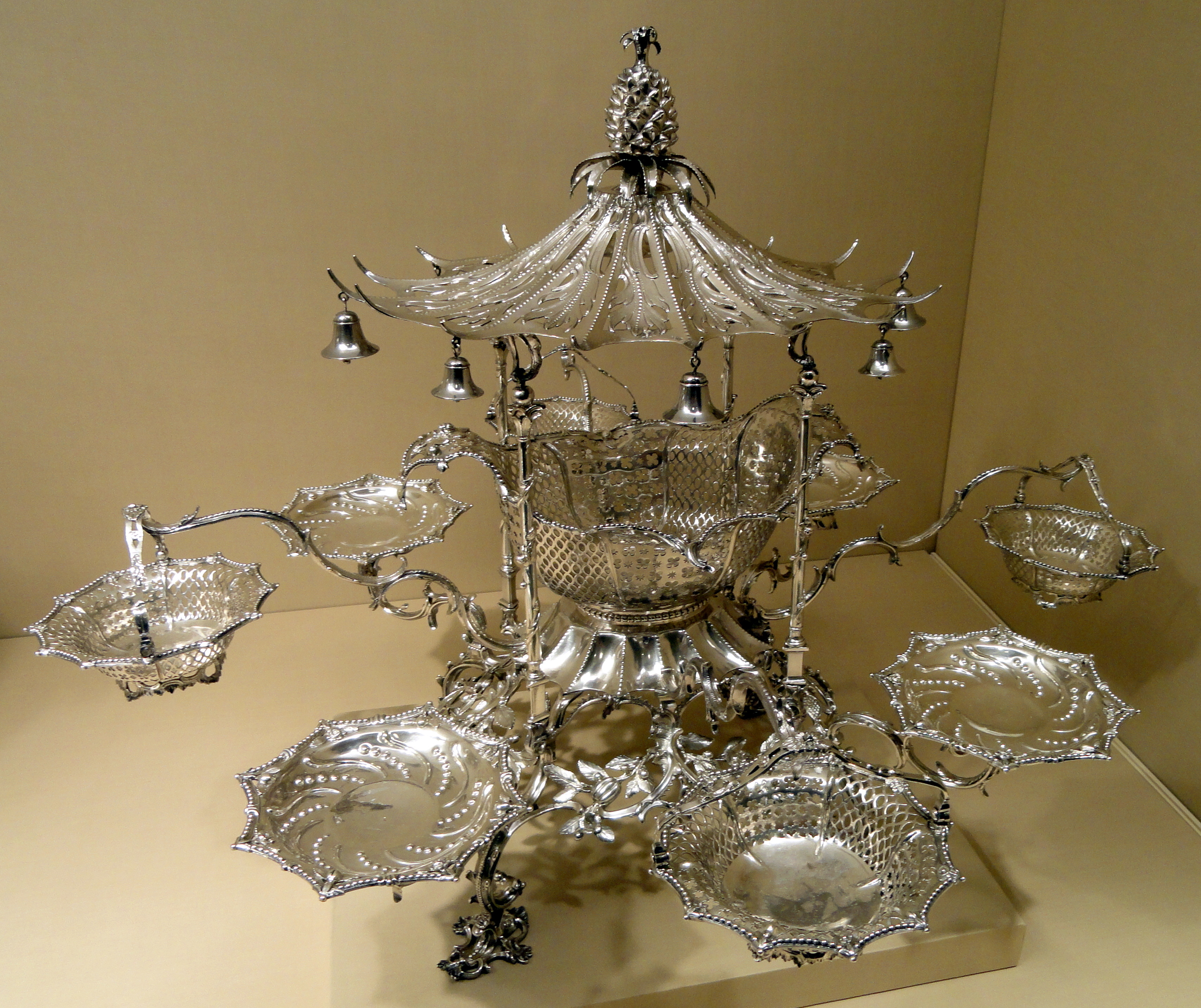
Silver epergne, London, 1761

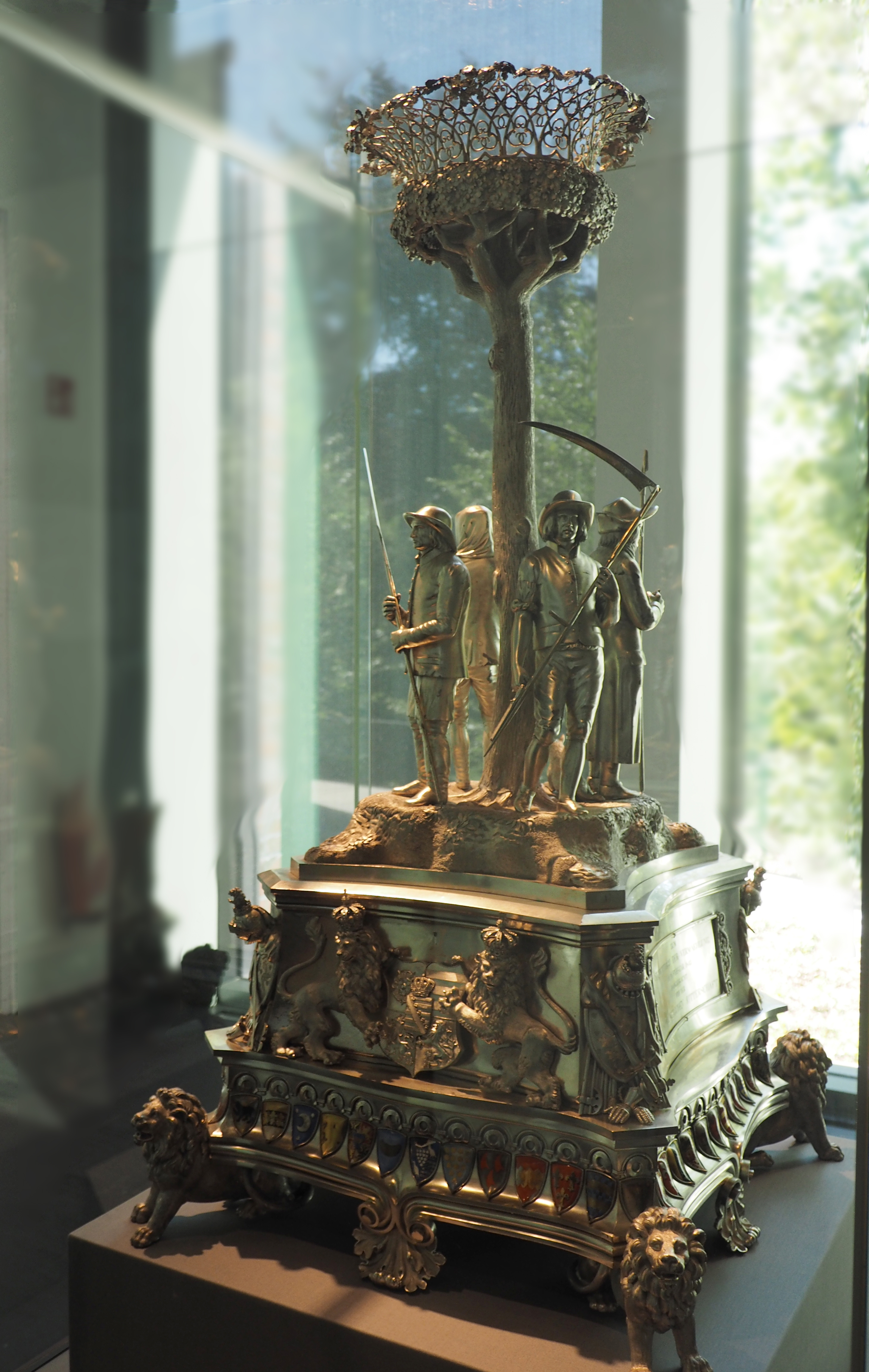
Silver, 1843, for the Crown Prince of Hanover

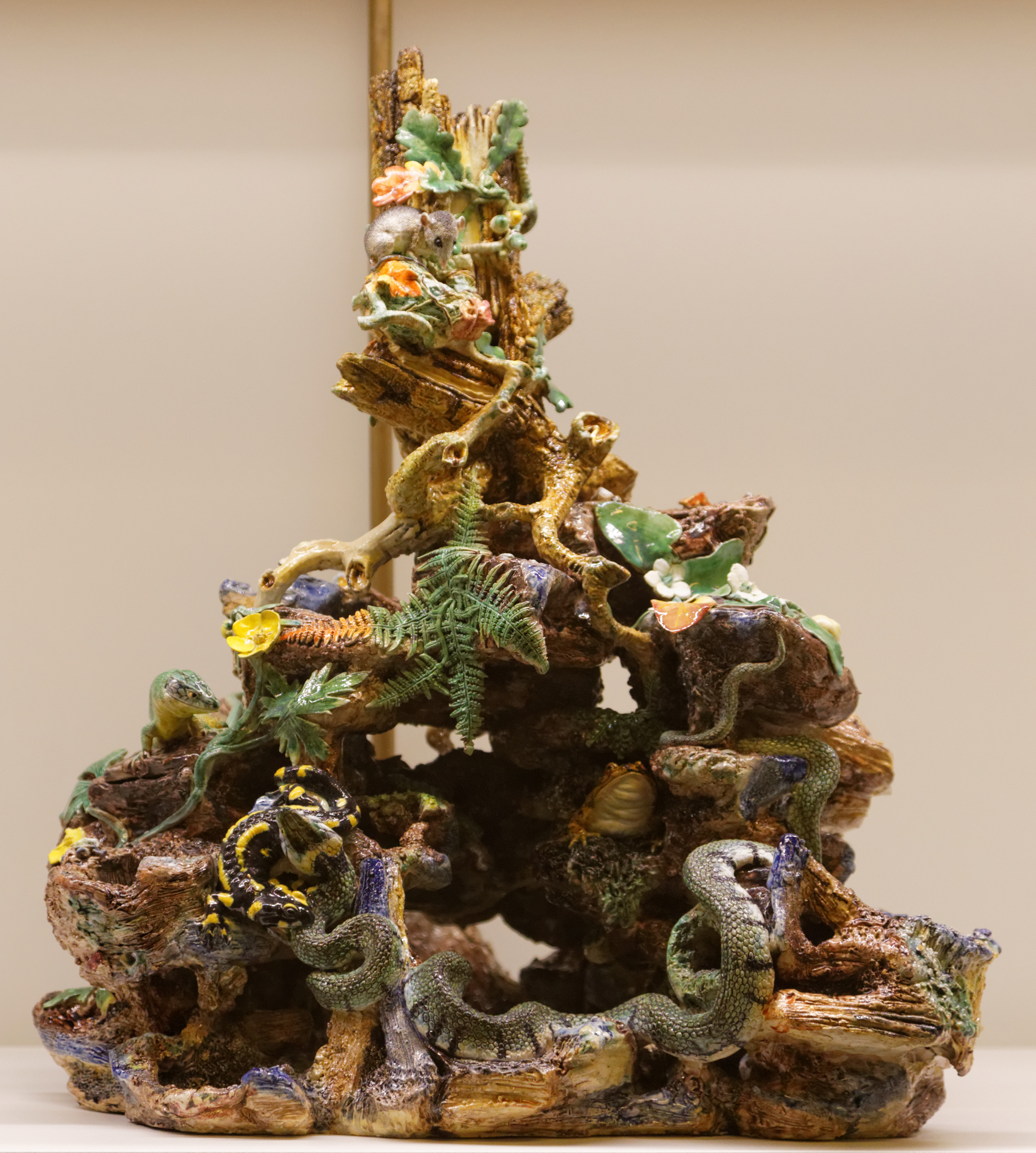
French faience, 1860

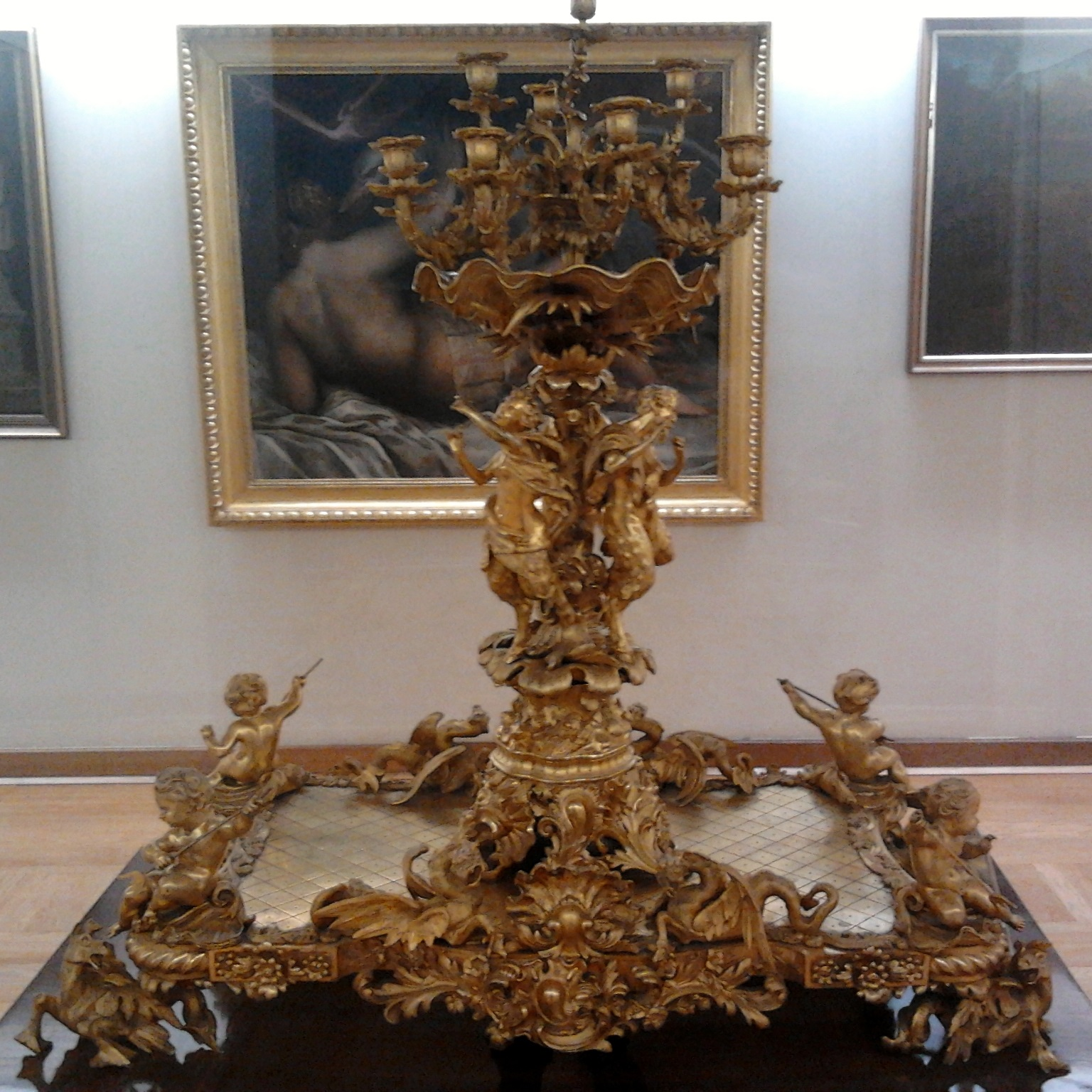
French ormolu, later 19th century
