= Epergne =

Decorative centerpiece

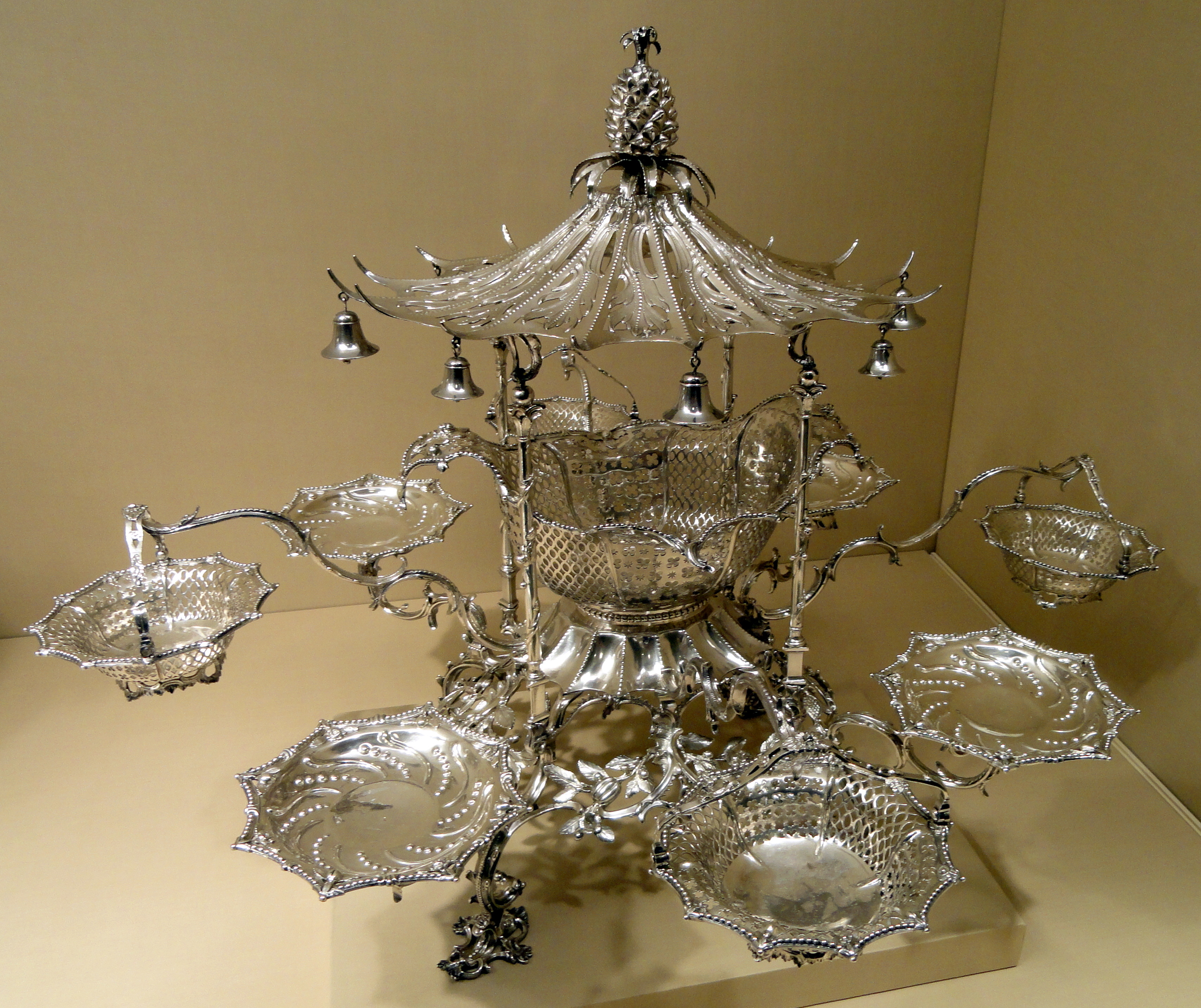
Silver epergne, London, 1761

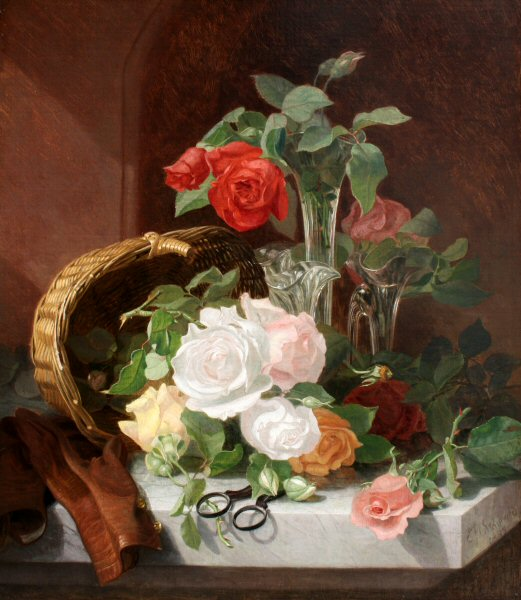
Flowers in a Glass Epergne by Eloise Harriet Stannard, 1889

An epergne (/ɪˈpɜːrn, eɪ-/ ih-PURN, ay-) is a type of table centerpiece that is usually made of silver but may be made of any metal or glass or porcelain.

An epergne generally has a large central "bowl" or basket sitting on three to five feet. From this center "bowl" radiate branches supporting small baskets, dishes, or candleholders. There may be between two and seven branches. Epergnes were traditionally made from silver, however from around the start of the 20th century, glass was also employed.

== Name ==
The derivation is probably from the French épargne meaning "saving," the idea being that dinner guests were saved the trouble of passing dishes (although an epergne in French is called a surtout). In addition the word épergne in French can also mean "spare", another way of saying "to save", or a spare, meaning "reserve or extra".

== Usage ==
An epergne may be used to hold any type of food or dessert. It may also be used as a designer object to hold candles, flowers or ornaments for a holiday. In traditional use, an epergne is a fancy way to display side dishes, fruit, or sweetmeats; it can be used for chips, dips, or other finger foods.
