= Pierre Chevenard =

Pierre Antoine Jean Sylvestre Chevenard
- Born: 31 December 1888; Thizy, Rhône, France
- Died: 15 August 1960 (aged 71)
- Education: École des Mines at Saint-Étienne
- Occupation: Metallurgist
- Known for: Work on the tempering and hardening of steels

Pierre Antoine Jean Sylvestre Chevenard (31 December 1888 – 15 August 1960) was a French metallurgist who worked on the tempering and hardening of steels and introduced the idea of precision metallurgy in industrial steel production and innovated measurement devices that carry his name including the Chevenard thermobalance and dilatometer.

Chevenard was born in Thizy, Rhône in a family that was involved in the textile industry and graduated from the École des Mines at Saint-Étienne in 1910. He worked as an engineer in 1911 at the Imphy steel works where he worked under Henry Fayol along with Charles Edouard Guillaume and Léon Guillet (1873–1946). He helped establish a laboratory for scientific metallurgy in the plant. Chevenard became head of metallurgical research in 1912 and in 1920 Guillaume received a Nobel Prize for his work on alloys that did not expand with temperature. Chevenard developed several instruments including the differential dilatometer recorder and a thermomagnetometer. He developed steel alloys of tungsten, chromium, and nickel that were corrosion resistant for use in steam turbines. After World War I Chevenard became a professor of metallurgy at the school of mines in Saint Etienne but continued to be an industrial consultant. Chevenard examined the flow of metals and friction, and developed several measuring techniques and instruments. He collaborated with Albert Portevin on nickel alloys.

Chevenard was made an officer of the Legion of Honour in 1931.
