= Claude-Aimé Chenavard =

French decorative painter (1798–1838)

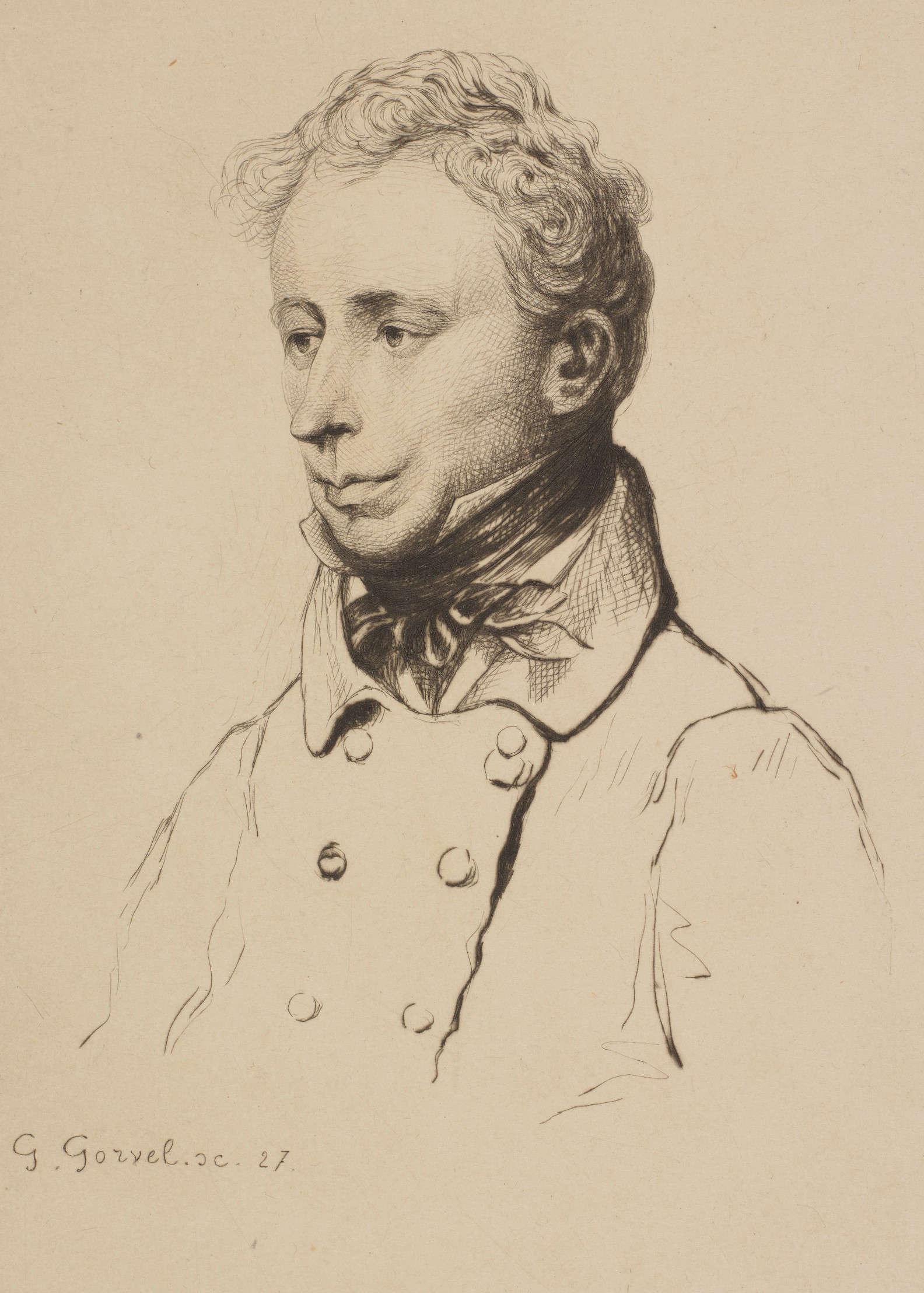
Aimé Chenavard

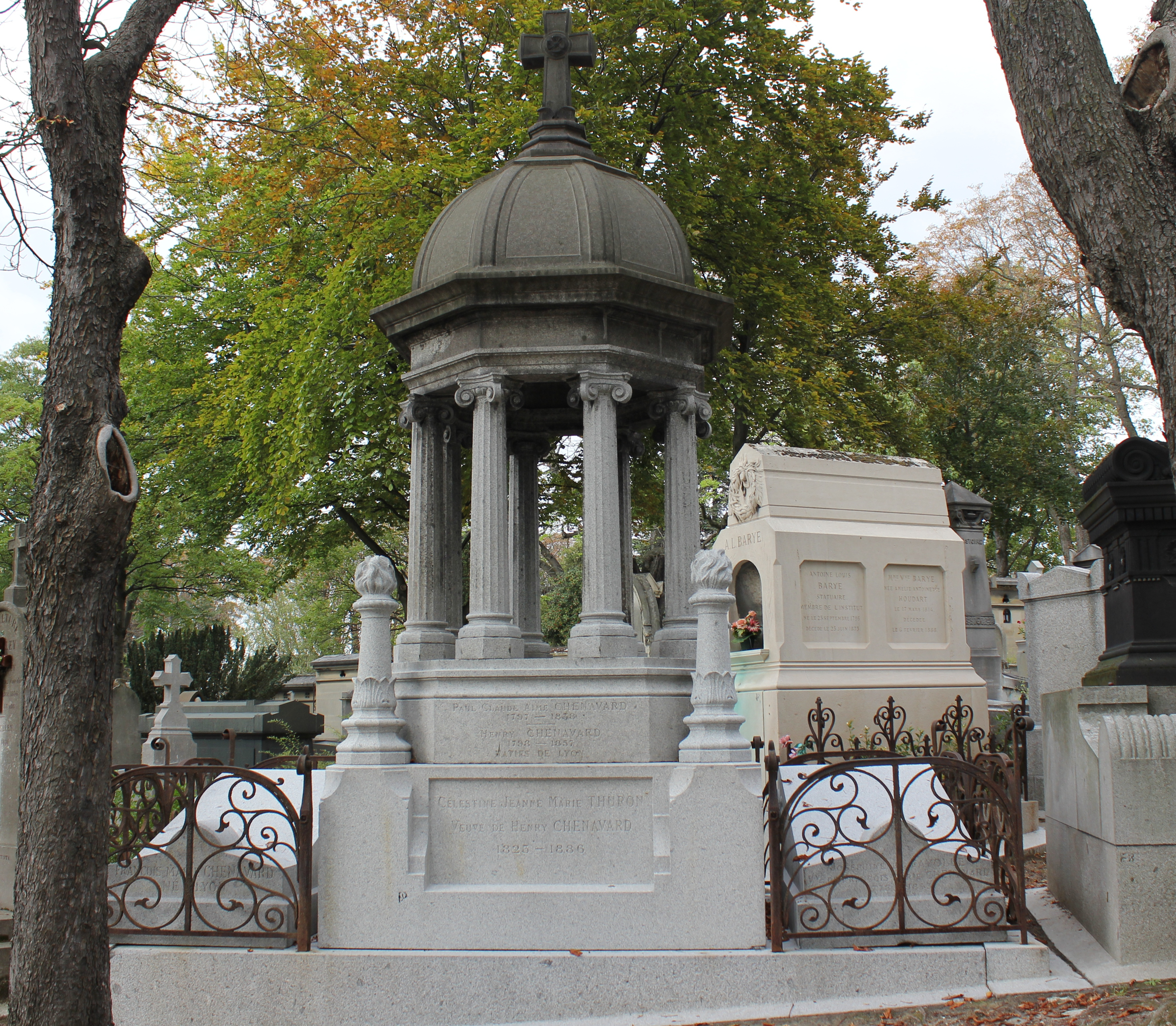
Monument in Père-Lachaise

Claude-Aimé Chenavard (1798 – 16 June 1838) was a French decorative painter and draughtsman and was born at Lyons in 1798. He published Nouveau Recueil de Decorations intérieures, 1833–1835, and Album de L'Ornemaniste, 1835. He died in Paris in 1838 and was buried in Père Lachaise Cemetery.
