= Pierrette Perrin =

Pierrette Perrin née Candelot (died 1794), was a French industrialist. After the death of her husband Claude Perrin in 1748, she developed his company in Marseille into one of the biggest faience factories in France, with export internationally to the Middle East, the West Indies and Latin America. Her factory came to be known as Veuve Perrin ("Perrin Widow") after her.

== Life and career ==
Pierrette Candelot was born to Bégnine Richard and the silk worker Jean Ignace Candelot. She married 27 November 1736 to Claude Perrin. She was widowed in 1748, and took over the business of her late spouse.

She entered into a partnership agreement with Honoré Savy, who was a member of the Academy of Painting and Sculpture in Marseille. This cooperation lasted from 1760 to 1770, but was less active after 1764, where Savy founded his own company. In 1774 the widow Perrin formed a second association with his son and Antoine Abellard, grandson of Antoine Clérissy. This continued to operate until her death in 1794.

Her son Joseph and daughter Anne took over until the final closure in 1803.
