= Veuve Perrin =

Pottery factory in Marseille, France

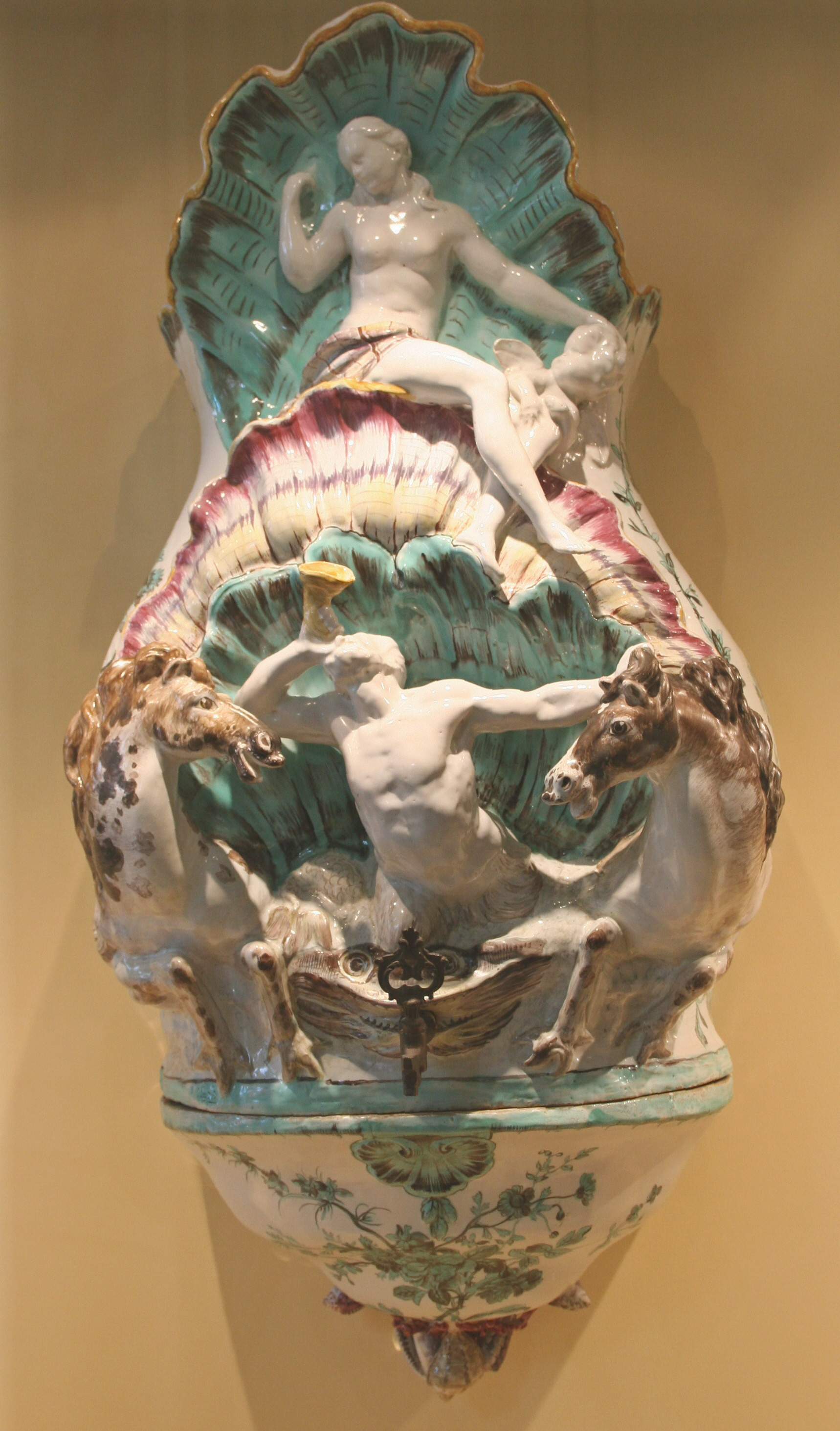
- Applique fountain representing the chariot of Amphitrite
- Founded: 1748
- Founder: Pierette Candelot
- Defunct: 1803
- Headquarters: Marseille, France
- Products: Faïence

Veuve Perrin (Widow Perrin) was a factory in Marseille, France, that manufactured Faïence wares between 1748 and 1803.

== History ==
Claude Perrin, born in Nevers on 20 April 1696, settled in Marseille in 1733 where he died on 25 March 1748.

Pierette Candelot, widow of Claude Perrin, took over the factory after her husband's death. It became known as Veuve Perrin. She entered into a partnership agreement with Honoré Savy, who was a member of the Academy of Painting and Sculpture in Marseille. This cooperation lasted from 1760 to 1770, but was less active after 1764, where Savy founded his own company. In 1774 the widow Perrin formed a second association with his son and Antoine Abellard, grandson of Antoine Clérissy. This continued to operate until her death in 1794. Her son Joseph and daughter Anne took over until the final closure in 1803.

== Products ==
The factory used the petit feu technique of decorating, with successive firings, which let it obtain a variety of colors that rivaled those of porcelain.

This factory became well known for its naturalistic polychrome decorations of flowers and insects. Around 1764 the factory introduced a turquoise enamel. Some of the wares were decorated with fish and shells, seaside scenes and views of the port of Marseille. Production was characterized by a wide variety of shapes and designs, often extravagant in molding and decoration. Types of decoration are very varied: polychrome on a yellow enamel, imitation Chinese decoration, decoration with fish, landscapes, animals, flowers, decor with green shades. The factory is known for its large soup tureens, which often were decorated with paintings of fish. Statuettes and fancy goods were also produced.

== Gallery ==
The Musée de la Faïence de Marseille has an important collection of Veuve Perrin works.

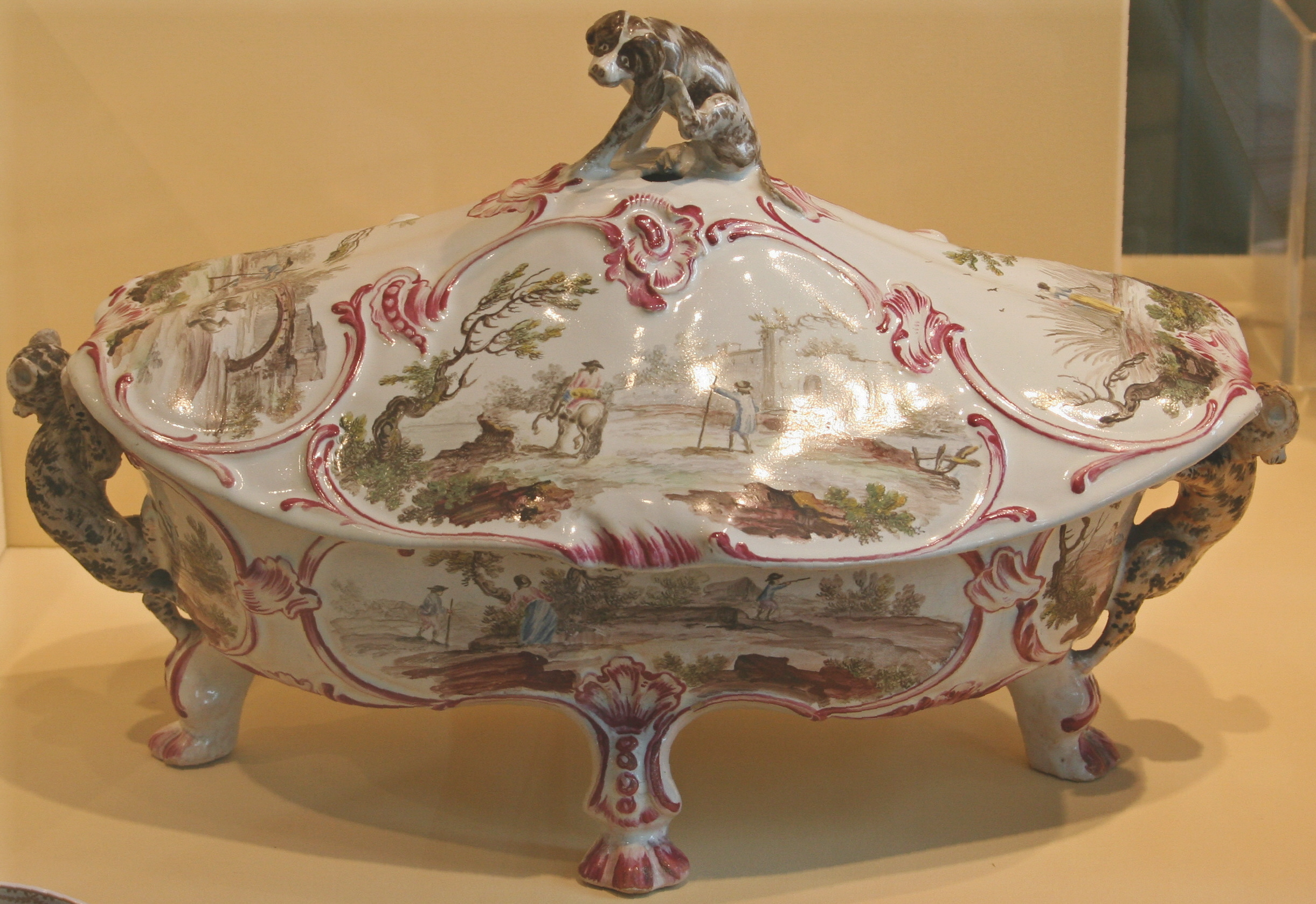
Bowl with dog scratching his ear

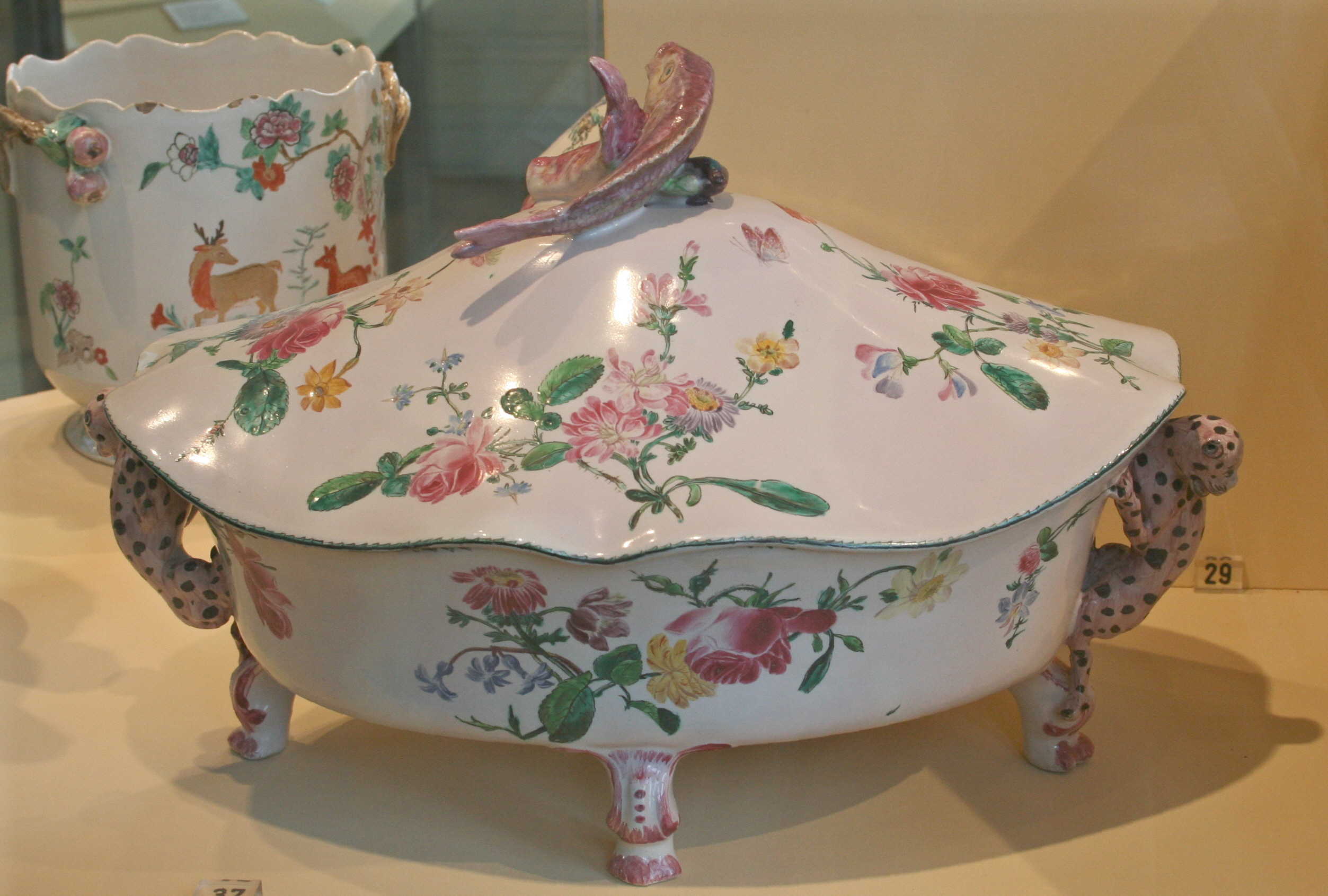
Oblong bowl

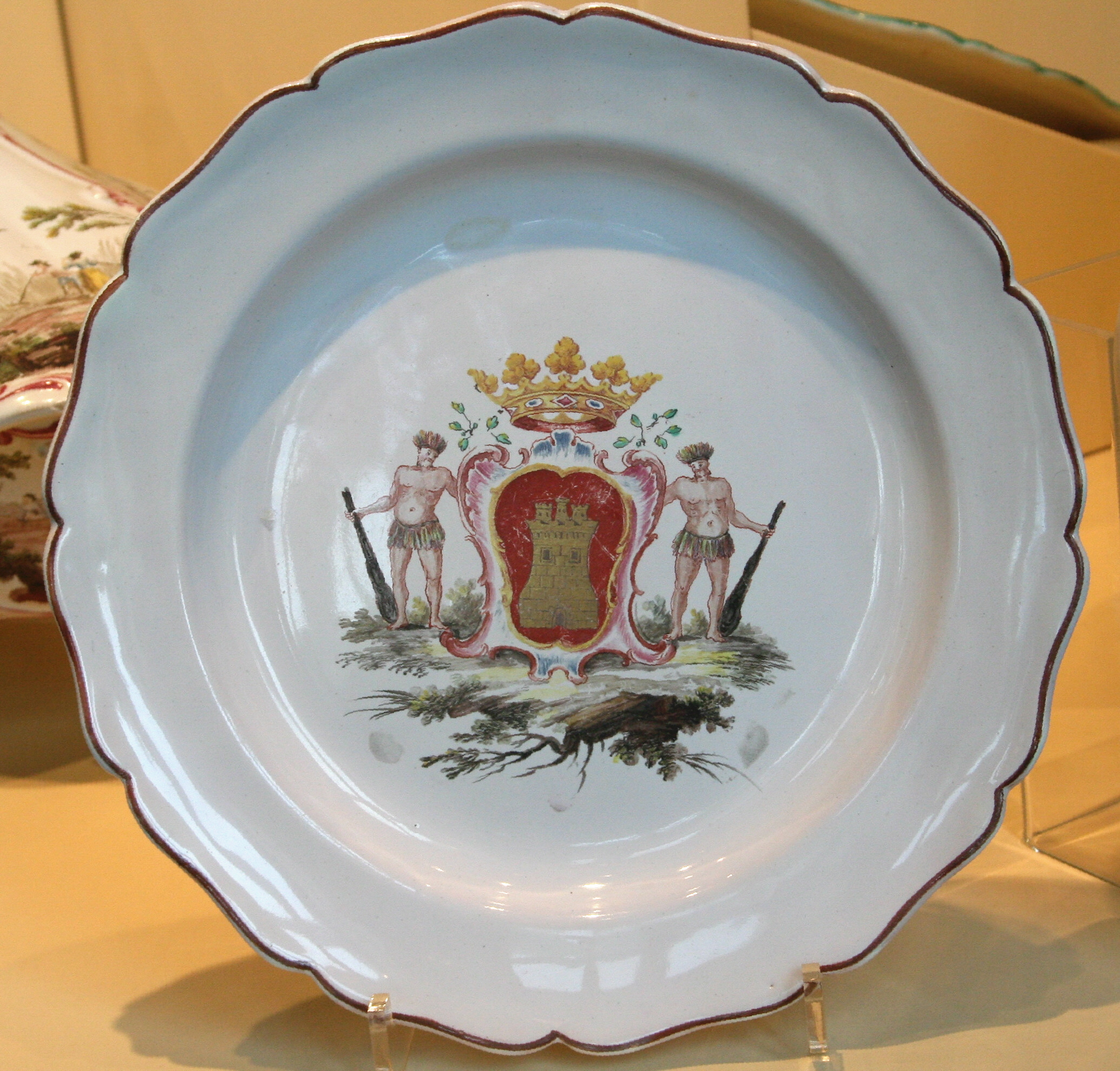
Plate

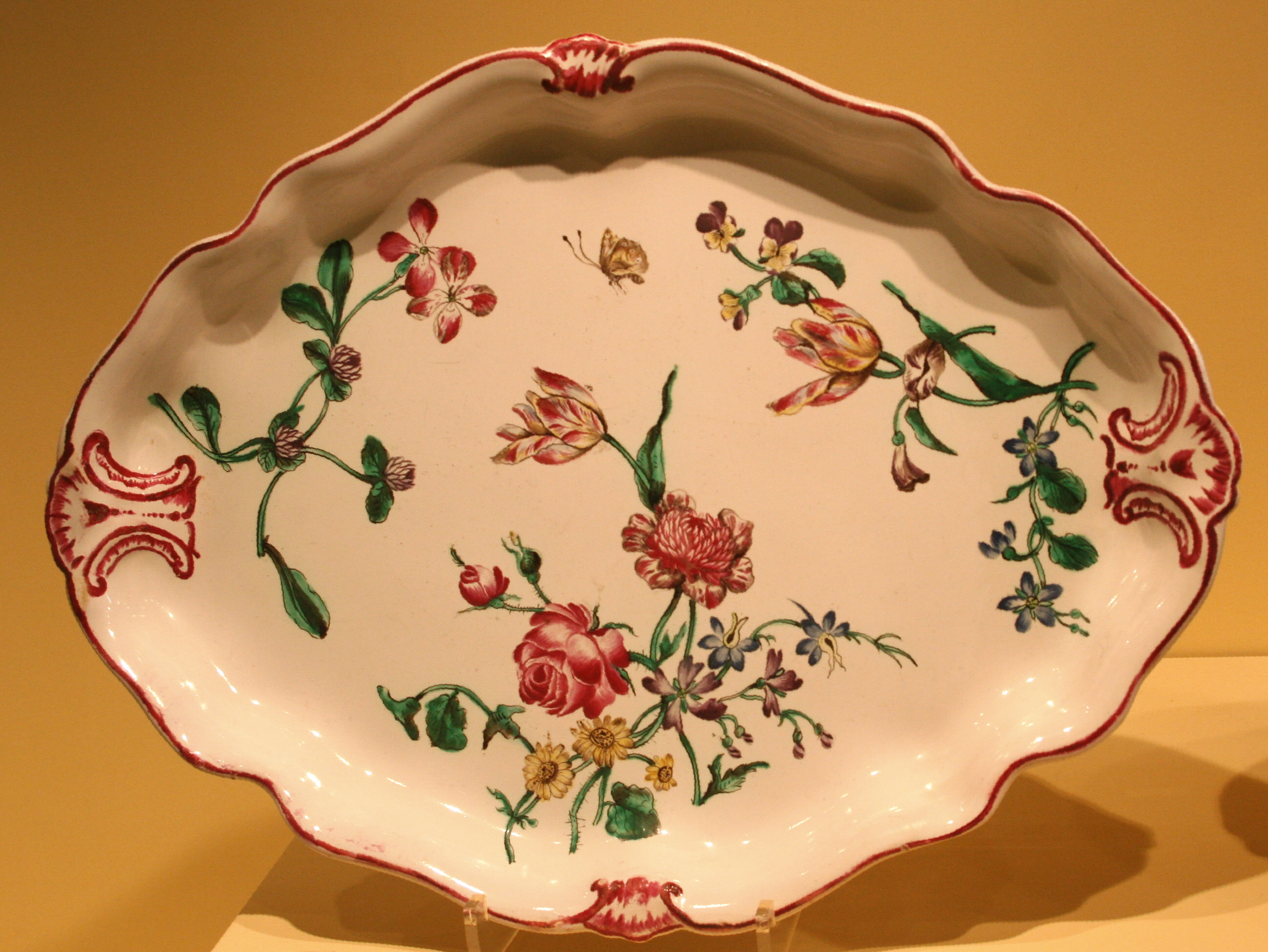
Oblong plate decorated in polychrome using petit fue

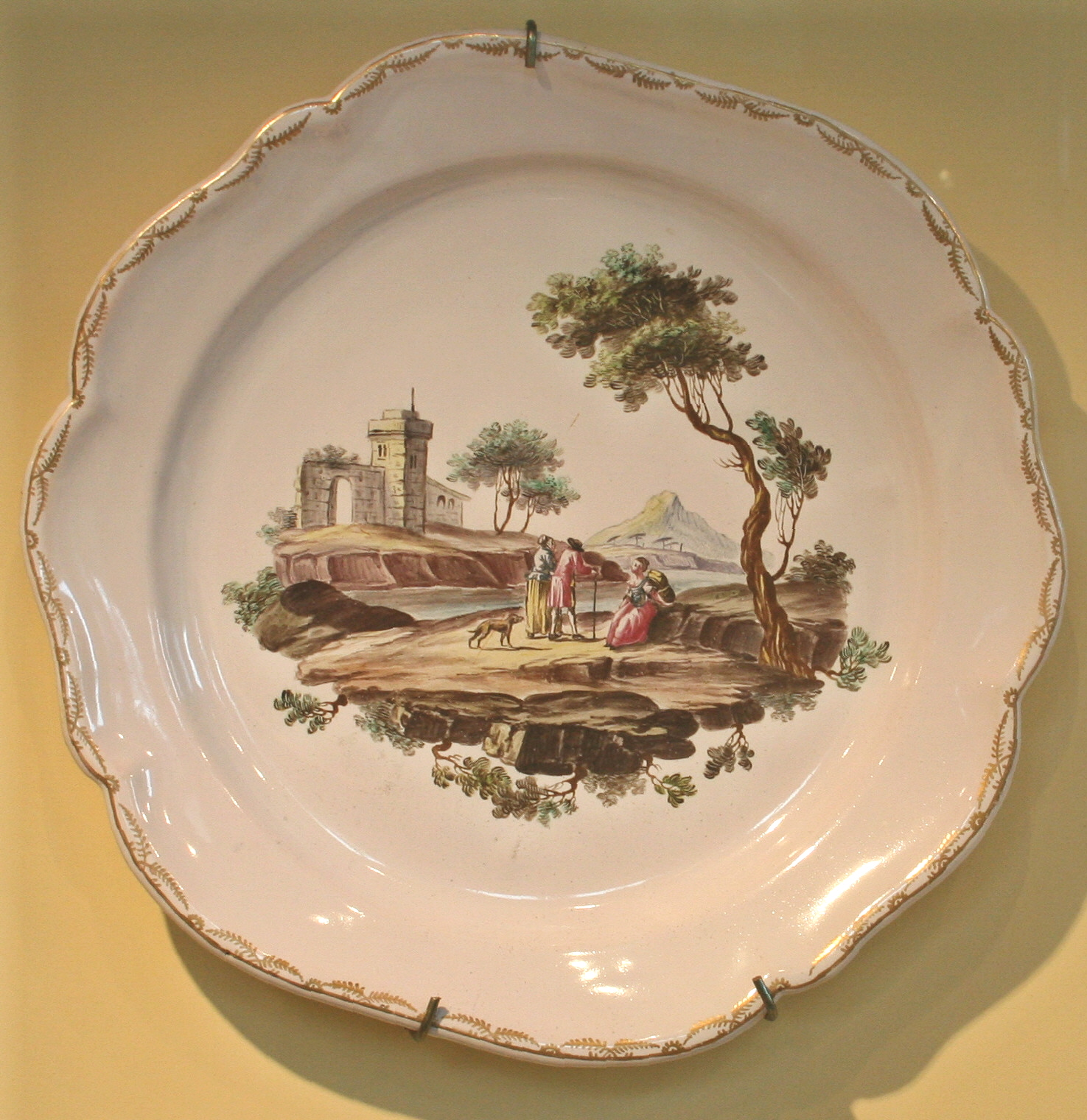
Plate with rural scene

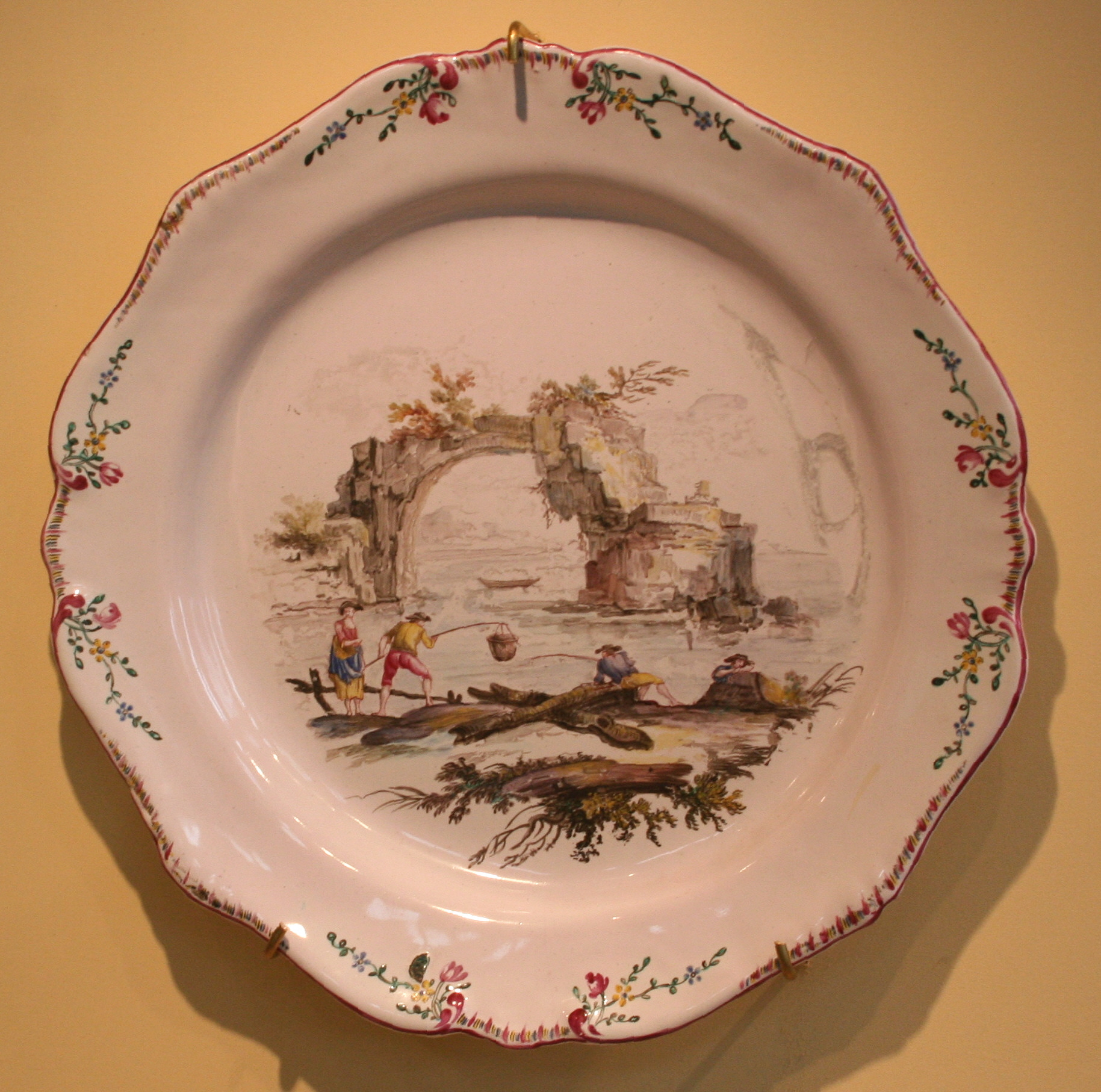
Plate with rural scene

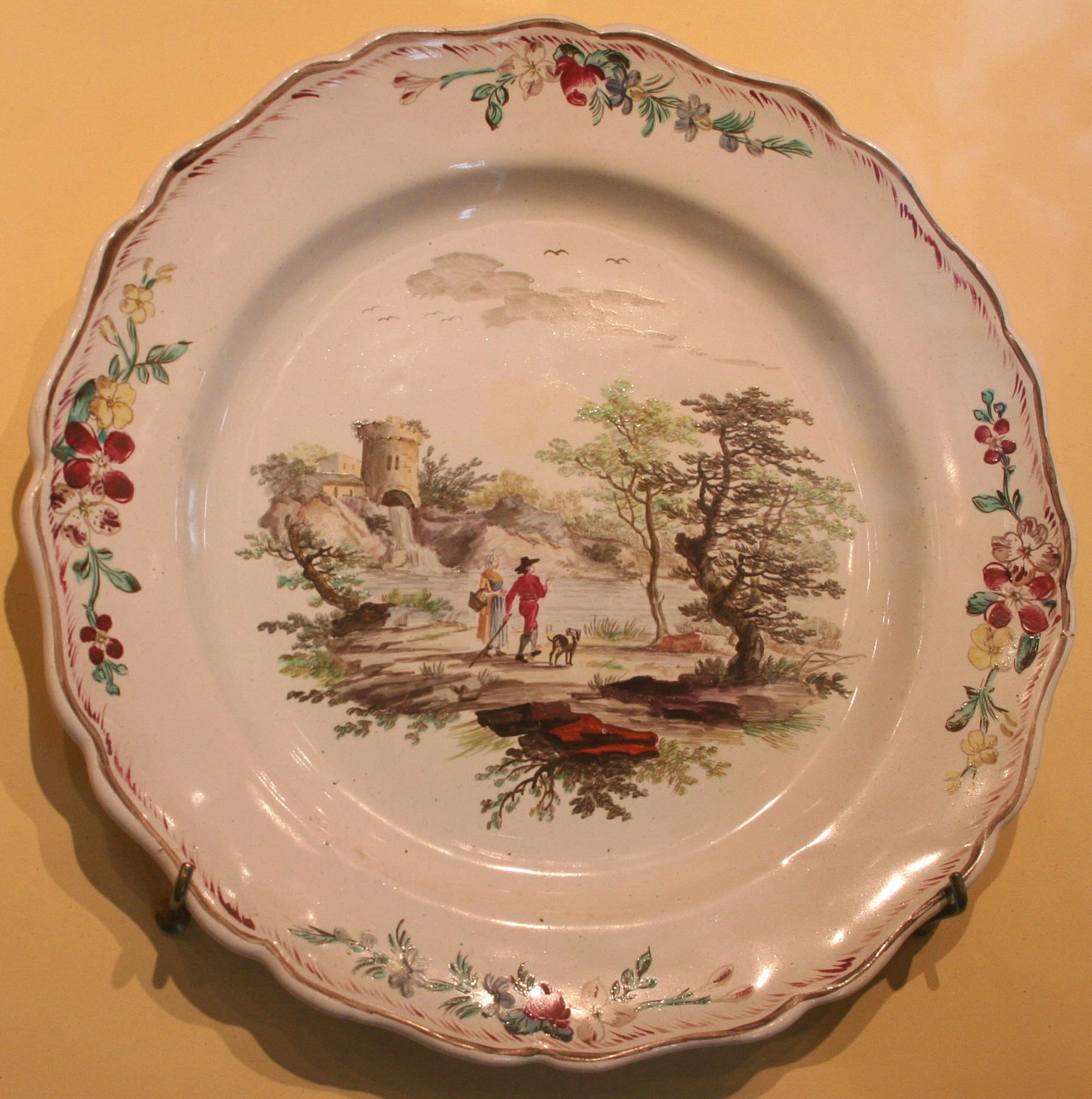
Plate with rural scene

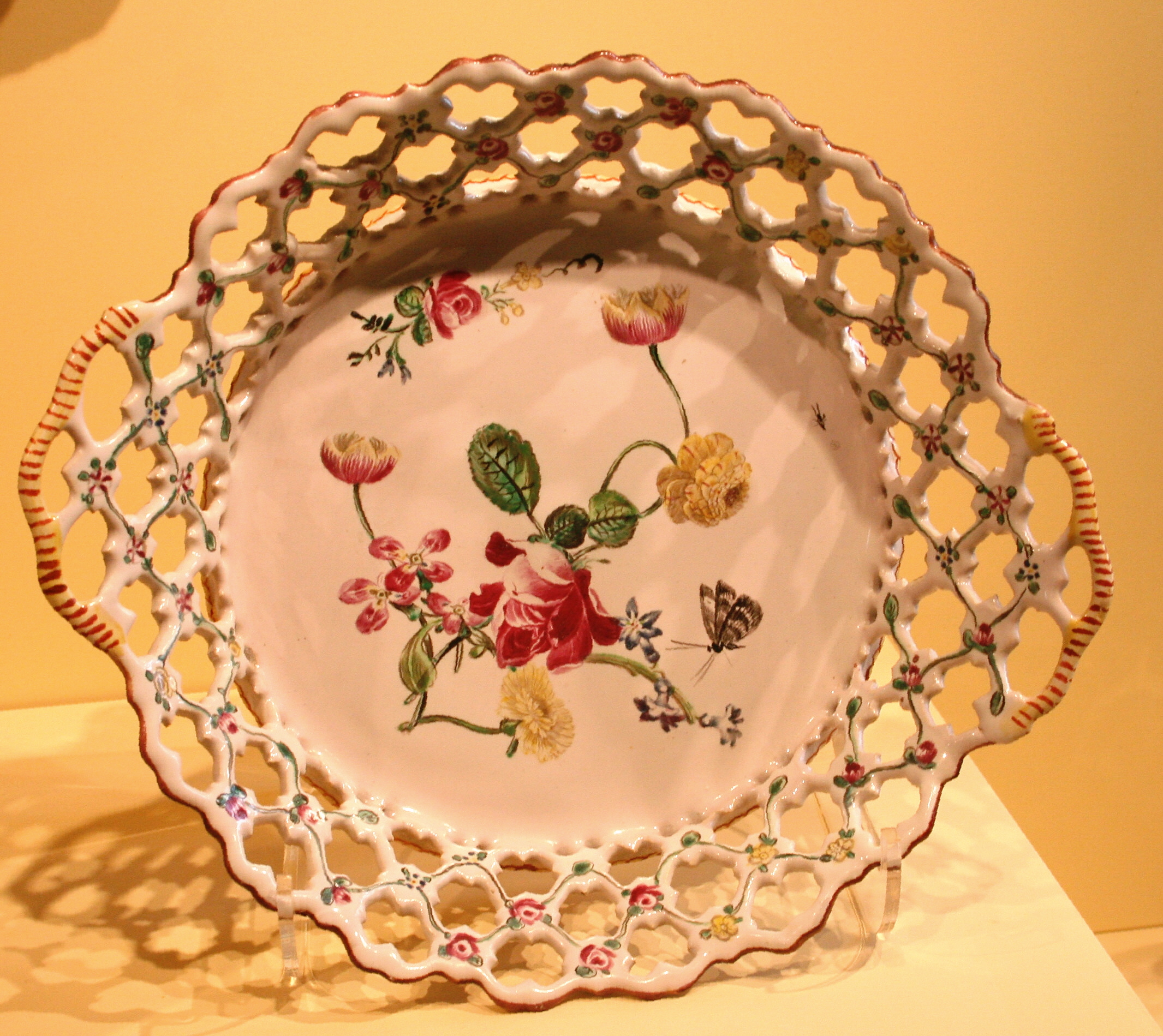
Openwork basket
