= Honoré Savy =

French potter and artist

- Born: 1749; Marseille, France
- Died: 1790 (aged 40–41)
- Occupation: Potter
- Years active: 1749 - 1790
- Known for: Manufacture of tin-glazed pottery faïence
- Children: None

Honoré Savy (1725–1790) was a French potter who was the founder of a factory that manufactured faience wares in Marseille, France, between 1749 and 1790. He is associated with the Veuve Perrin and Leroy factories.

== Career ==
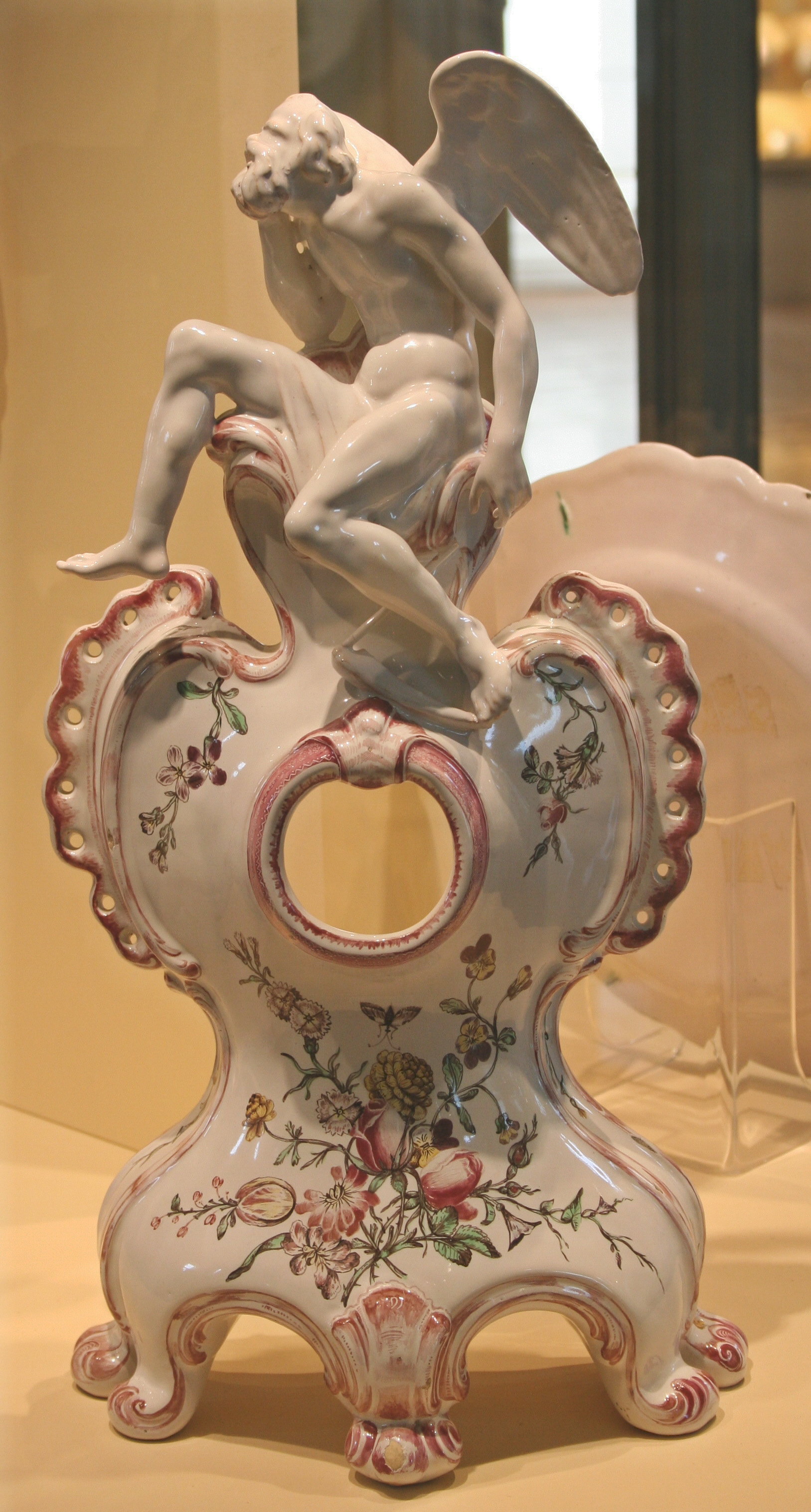
Tin-glazed earthenware watch stand with polychrome petit feu decoration produced by the workshop of Honoré Savy (1765 - 1770)

Around 1749 a new period of faience manufacture began in which the first factory was established by Honore Savy in which polychrome decoration succeeded the earlier style using blue with some violet.

A letter of 27 September 1765 to M. Bertin described Savy as a master of fayance fabrication for fifteen years.

In 1765 Honoré Savy applied for permission to start making porcelain. The minister, Bertin, was discouraging. That year he became a member of the Royal Academy of Painting and Sculpture of Marseilles.

In July 1777 Savy was visited by Monsieur, le Comte de Provence, the brother of King Louis XVI. Monsieur inspected a large display of all types of faience in the workshop's gallery, but there is no mention of porcelain. Monsieur placed the factory under his protection, and gave permission for it to use his arms, and to display a statue of the prince in the gallery.

A Marseille business directory for 1779–80 listed Savy as making both enamelled faience and porcelain.

== Personal life and death ==
Childless, Savy continued his work until his death on 24 September 1790.

== Products ==
Honoré Savy used classic themes of decoration: flowers, landscapes, seascapes and fish. He was the inventor of a green color, drawn from copper, used on pieces of monochrome green.

== Gallery ==
The Musée de la Faïence de Marseille has an important collection of work by Honoré Savy

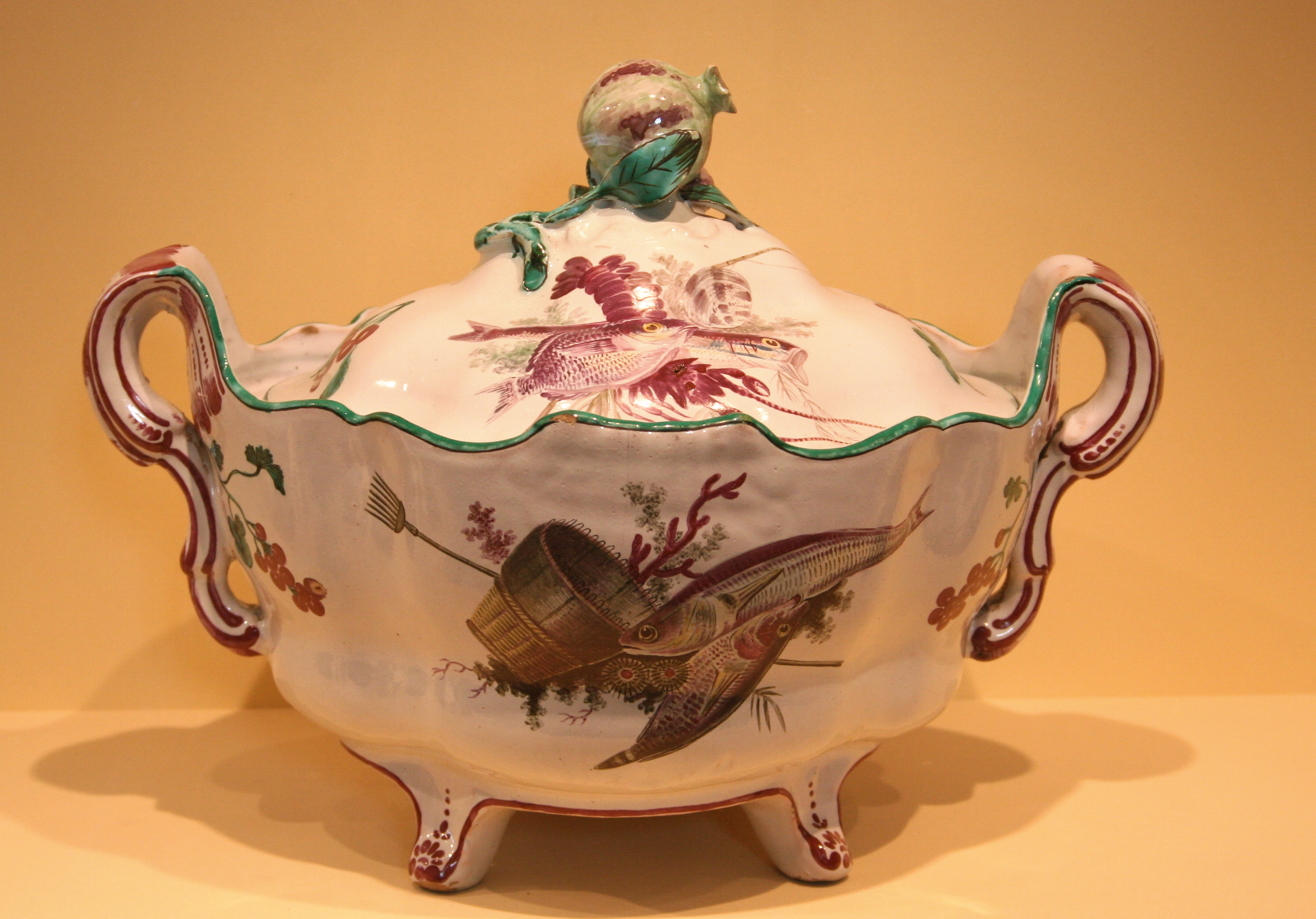
Tureen decorated with fish and other seafood

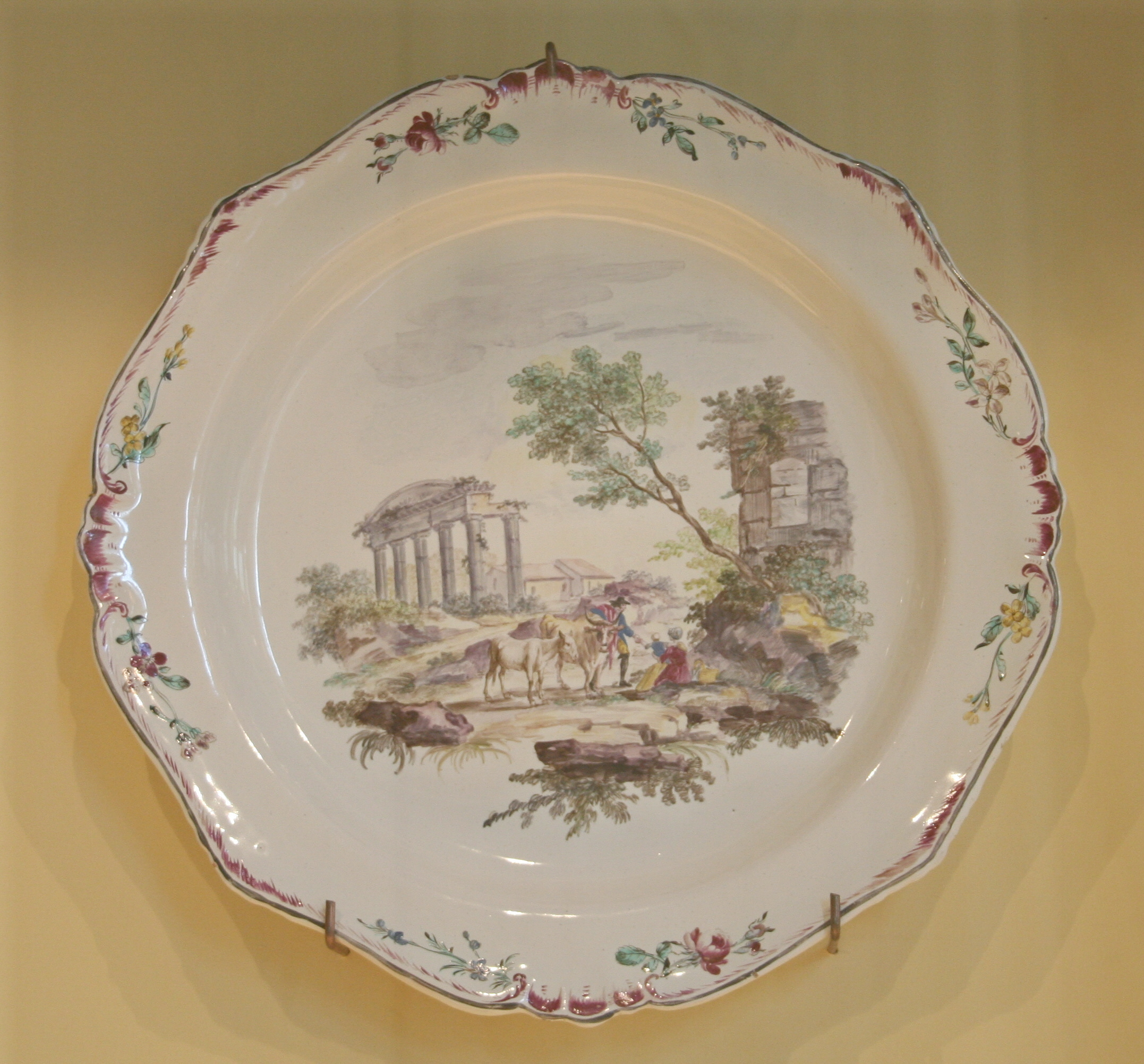
Circular plate

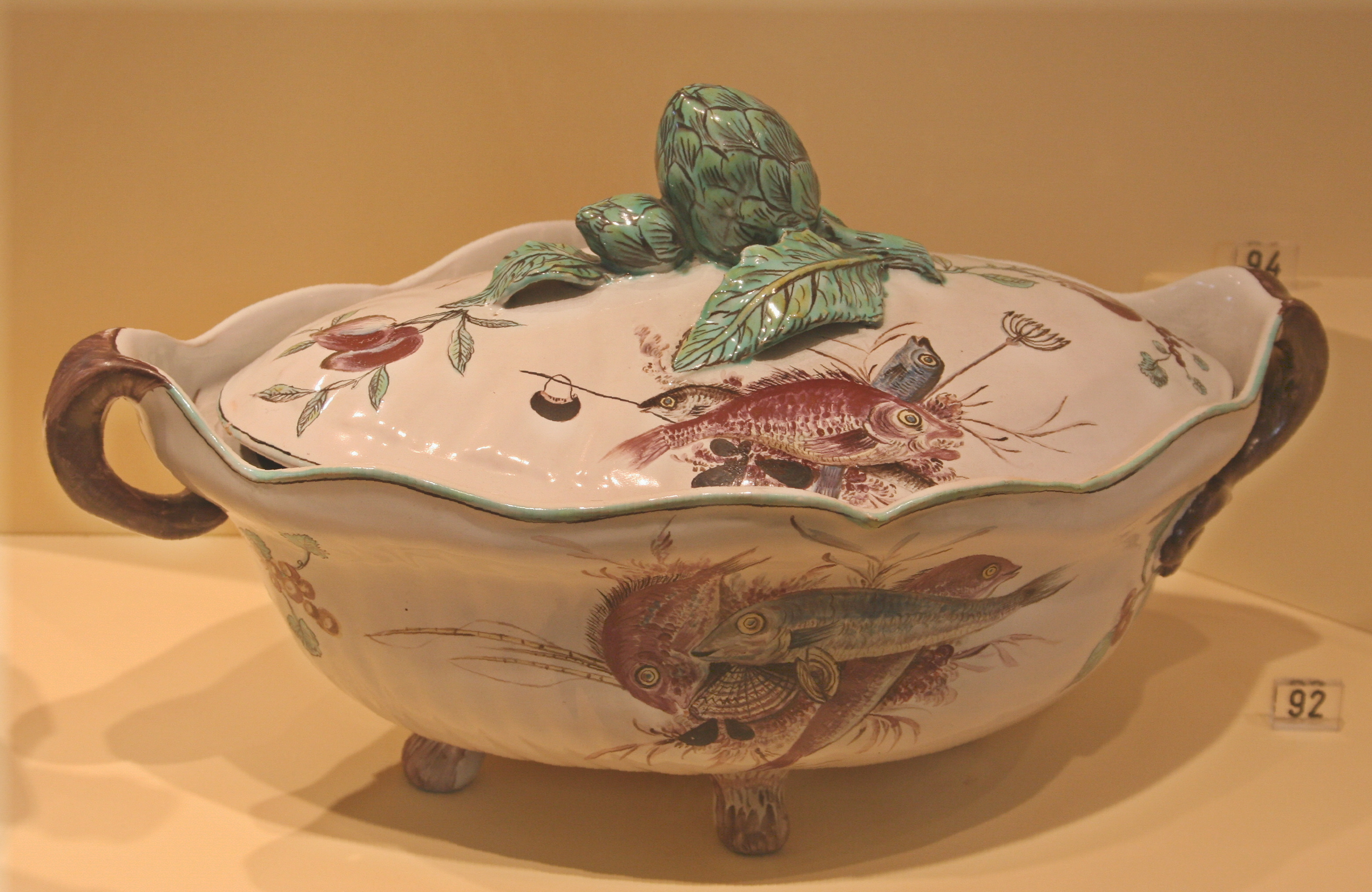
Oblong bowl

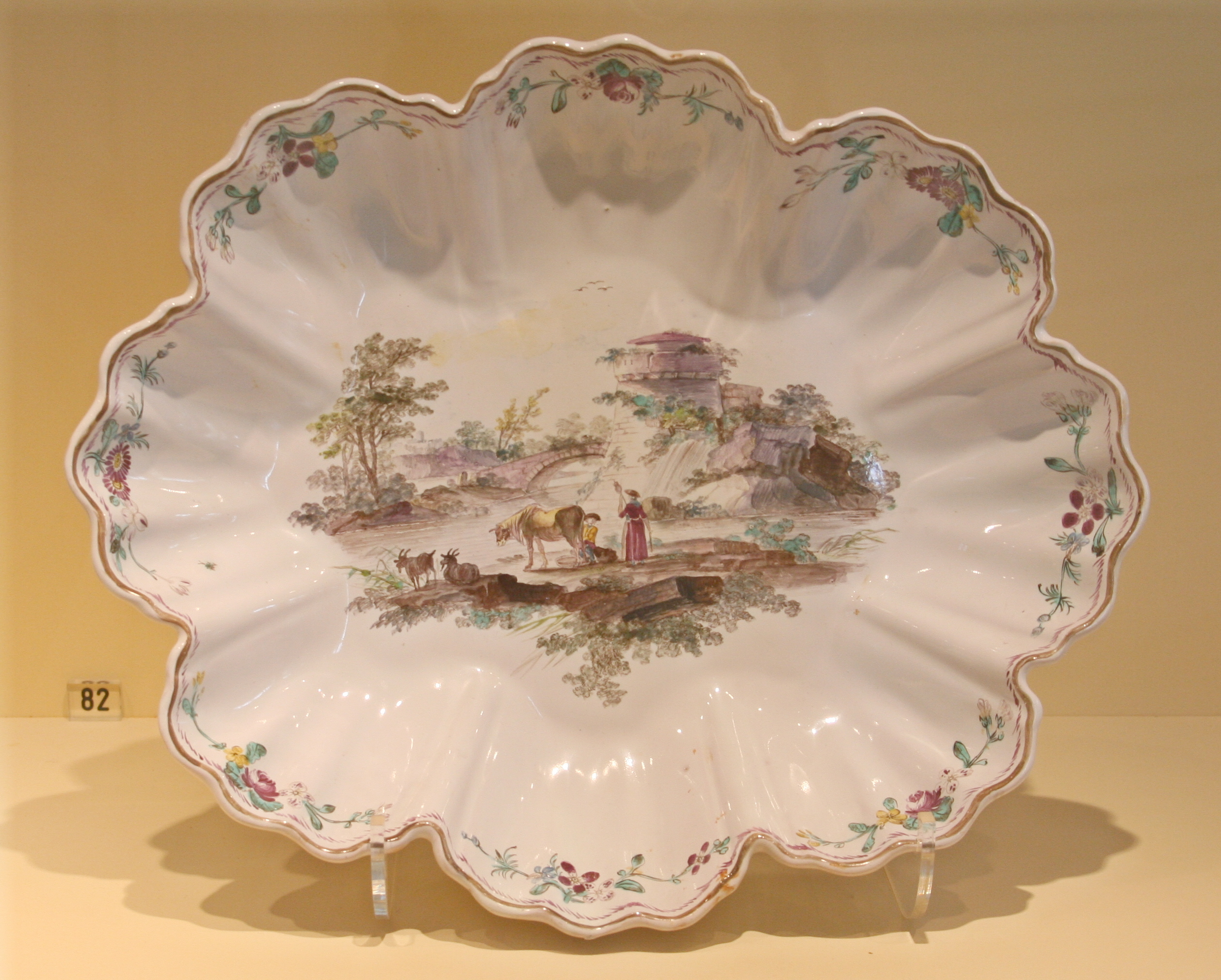
Oblong dish in the shape of a shell with a scalloped edge

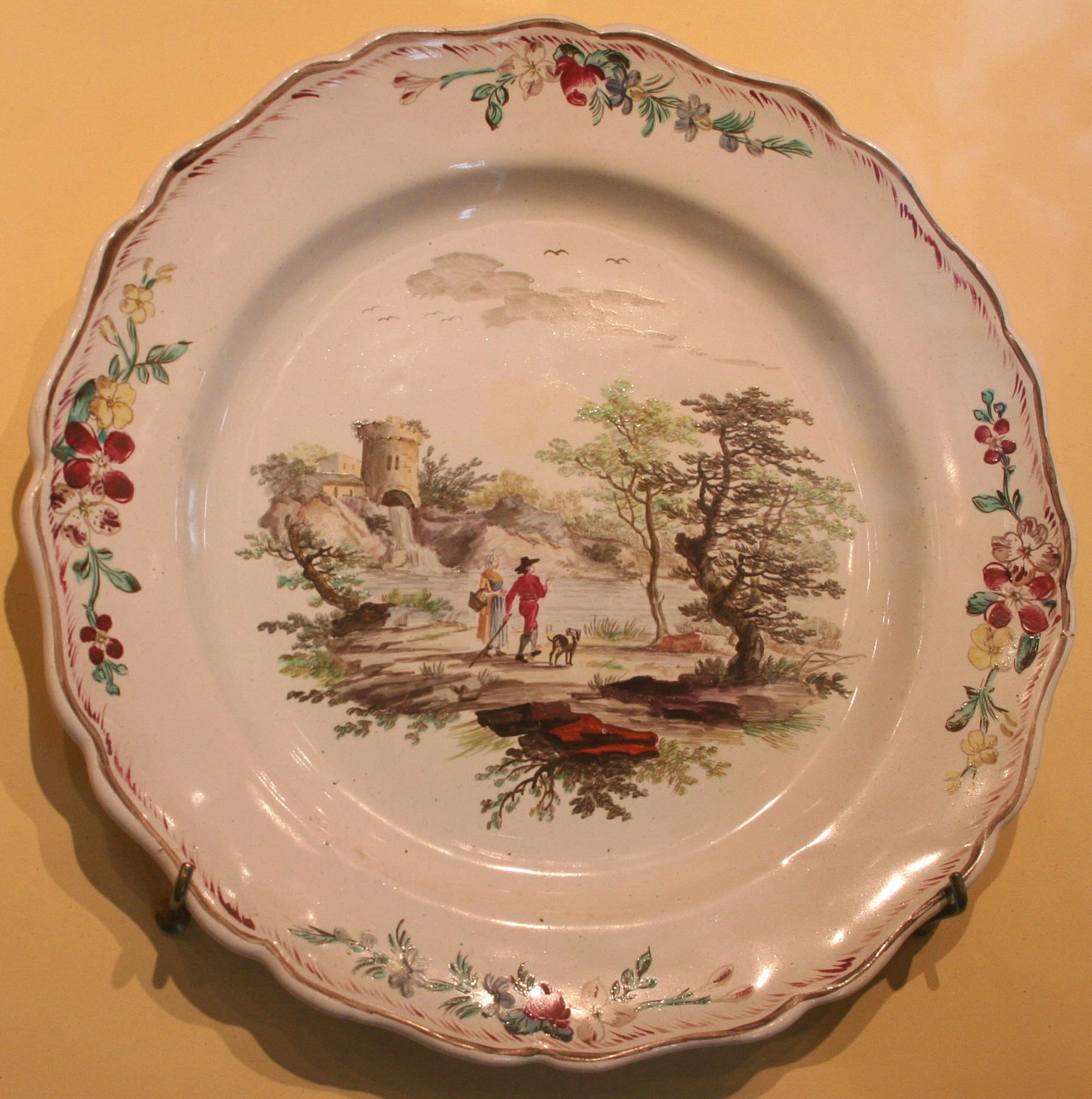
Plate with rural scene either by Honoré Savy or by Veuve Perrin
