= Proclus (disambiguation) =

Proclus was a 5th-century Greek Neoplatonic philosopher.

Proclus may also refer to:

== People in history ==
- Proclus of Constantinople, 5th-century saint
- Eutychius Proclus, 2nd-century grammarian, tutor of Marcus Aurelius, possibly author of the Chrestomathy
- Proclus, author of the Chrestomathy, which contains a summary of the lost Trojan epics from the ancient Greek Epic Cycle
- Proclus Oneirocrites, soothsayer
- Proclus Mallotes, Stoic philosopher
- Proclus of Laodicea or Proculeius, a priest at Laodicea in Syria, and author of philosophical works
- Proclus of Naucratis, 2nd-century teacher of rhetoric
- Proclus (mosaicist), an artist in the time of Augustus
- Larginus Proclus, 1st-century German who narrowly escaped execution by Domitian
- Proclus (Montanist), 2nd-century founder of the sect called the Procliani
- Proclus of Rhegium, 1st-century physician

== Other uses ==
- Proclus (crater), a crater on the Moon

== See also ==
- Proculus (disambiguation)
- Proculeia gens
