= Proculus (disambiguation) =

Proculus (died c. 281) was a Roman usurper against Emperor Probus in 280.

Proculus (or Italian Procolo) or Saint Proculus may also refer to:

== People ==
- Proculus (praenomen), a Roman praenomen
- Proculus (jurist), 1st century Roman jurist, founder of the Proculeian school
- Proculus Julius, in the legendary history of the Roman Kingdom
- Saint Proculus of Verona (died c. 320 AD), first bishop of Verona
- Saint Proculus of Pozzuoli (died c. 305 AD), martyr
- Saint Proculus of Bologna (Saint Proculus the Soldier) (died c. 304 AD)
- Proculus, 6th century bishop of the Roman Catholic Diocese of Narni
- Proculus (prefect of Constantinople), died 393
- Proclus (Montanist), or Proculus, founder of the sect called the Procliani

== Churches in Italy ==
- San Procolo, Bologna
- San Procolo, Florence
- San Procolo, Verona

== See also ==
- Proculeia gens
- Proclus (disambiguation)
- Pontius Pilate's wife, sometimes called Saint Procula
