= Temple of Neptune (Rome) =

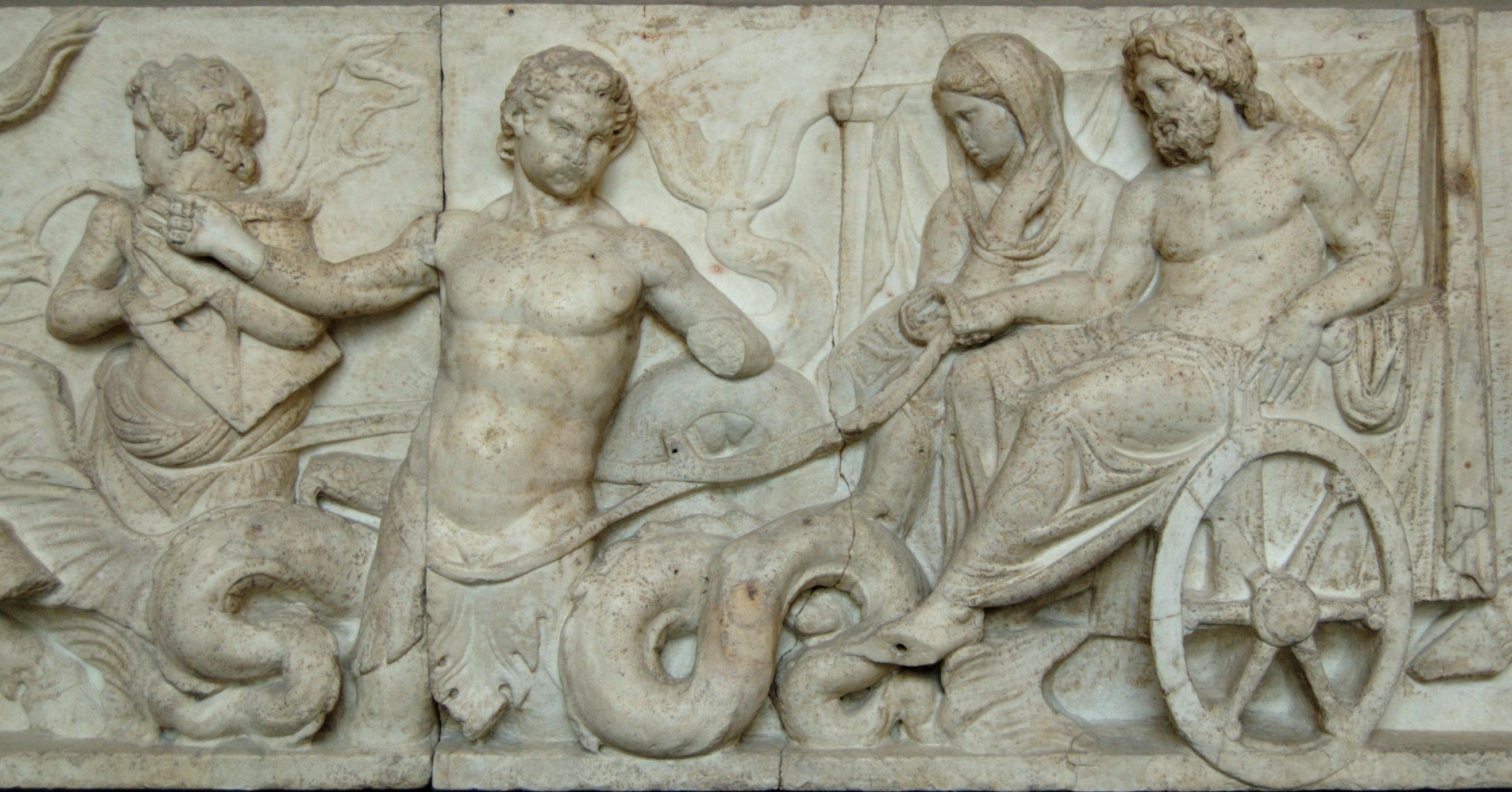
- Sea thiasos Amphitrite Poseidon Glyptothek Munich 239 front

- Shown in ancient Rome
- Interactive map of Temple of Neptune
- 41°53′41″N 12°28′27″E

The Temple of Neptune (Latin: Aedes Neptuni) was an ancient Roman temple dedicated to Neptune on the Campus Martius near the Circus Flaminius in Rome.

== History ==
It was built in 220 BC, though the earliest mention of a temple dedicated to Neptune dates to 206 BC, relating to its doors and altar. A new temple was built by consul Gnaeus Domitius Ahenobarbus to commemorate his naval victory at Philippi over Gnaeus Domitius Calvinus - he may have vowed a temple to Neptune on the eve of battle in return for success in it. He began construction sometime after his arrival back in Rome in 35 BC and placed a sculptor by Scopas inside it showing Neptune, Thetis and Achilles surrounded by Nereids, Tritons and sea monsters If still in use during the 4th-century, it would have been closed during the persecution of pagans in the late Roman Empire.

=== Archeology ===
A large frieze, known as the Altar of Domitius Ahenobarbus, showing a lustratio of a Roman army and a sea thiasus, probably comes from this temple—it is now split between the Louvre in Paris and the Glyptothek in Munich.

The church of San Salvatore in Campo was long thought to be built on the temple's foundations, but the church is probably too far from the Circus Flaminius for this to be correct.

== See also ==
- List of Ancient Roman temples
