= Lustrum =

Unit of time, usually a five year period

A lūstrum (IPA: [ˈluːs̠t̪rʊ̃ˑ], plural lūstra) was a term for a five-year period in Ancient Rome.

It is distinct from the homograph lustrum (/ˈlʊstrəm/ LUSS-trəm): a haunt of wild beasts (and figuratively, a den of vice), plural lustra (/ˈlʊstrɑː/ LUUS-trah).

== History ==
The lustration was originally a sacrifice for expiation and purification offered by one of the censors in the name of the Roman people at the close of the taking of the census. The sacrifice was often in the form of an animal sacrifice, known as a suovetaurilia.

These censuses were taken at five-year intervals, thus a lūstrum came to refer to the five-year inter-census period. Lustrum (from luo) is a lustration or purification of the whole Roman people performed by one of the censors in the Campus Martius, after the taking of the census was over. As this purification took place only once in five years, the word lūstrum was also used to designate the time between two lustra.

The first lūstrum was performed in 566 BC by King Servius, after he had completed his census, and afterwards it is said to have taken place regularly every five years after the census was over. In the earliest period of the republic, the business of the census and the solemnities of the lūstrum were performed by the consuls. The first censors were appointed in 443 BC, and from this year down to 294 BC there had, according to Livy (X.47), only been 26 pairs of censors, and only 21 lustra, or general purifications, although if all had been regular, there would have been 30 pairs of censors and 30 lustra. Sometimes the census was not held at all, or at least not by the censors. The census might take place without the lūstrum, and indeed two cases of this kind are recorded, in 459 and 214 BC. In these cases, the lūstrum was not performed because of some great calamities that had befallen the republic.

The time when the lūstrum took place has been calculated. Six ancient Romulian years, of 304 days each, were, with the difference of two days, equal to four solar years of 365 days plus one leap year of 366 days; the six ancient years made 1824 days, while the five solar years contained 1826 days. The lūstrum, or the great year of the ancient Romans, was thus a cycle, at the end of which, the beginning of the ancient year nearly coincided with that of the solar year. As the coincidence, however, was not perfect, a month of 24 days was interposed in every eleventh lūstrum. It is highly probable that the recurrence of such a cycle or great year was, from the earliest times, solemnized with sacrifices and purifications, and that King Servius did not introduce them, but merely connected them with his census, and thus set the example for subsequent ages, which however, as we have seen, was not observed with regularity.

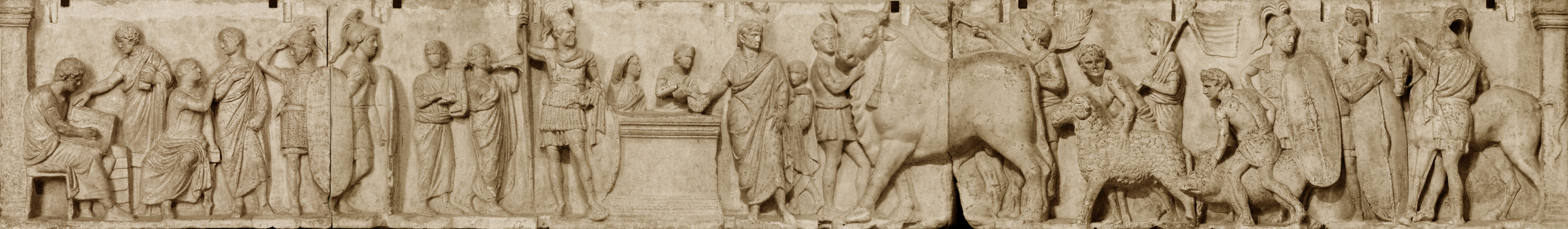
Census frieze from the so-called "Altar of Domitius Ahenobarbus", with the taking of the census (at left) and the procession of the suovetaurilia. The tall warrior standing at the altar is sometimes identified as the god Mars himself

== See also ==
- Lustratio
- Decade
- Century
- Millennium
