= Dionysus mosaic, Samatya =

The Dionysus mosaic found in Samatya, Istanbul, was uncovered in 1995 while the lot it was discovered in was under construction. It could have been created between the 4th and 5th century, with evidence supporting it to be from the later part of the 5th century. The mosaic is severely damaged due to construction machinery, and much of the piece is missing because of the urban landscape. What remains is a traditional Byzantine mosaic depicting the chariot of Dionysus, with a grand thiasos, or parade of followers circled around the god of wine.

== Design ==
The mosaic itself was 2.5 meters by 10 meters at the time of excavation. It consists of a square panel that is defined by two bands; the bands are multi-colored guilloches. Within the square panel are two circles; one within the other. These circles are framed by laurel wreaths that are created by a sawlike pattern band with colored fillets. Between the square panel and the outermost circle is the embodiment of Winter; a female dressed for winter with a green mantle. In the area between the first and second circle is Dionysus's thiasos. The thiasos is seen moving in a clockwise rotation with figures that include Silenos sitting on a mule supported by a satyr, a dancing maenad with an unidentified object in her hand, a male flutist, and a child with no clothes sitting upon a goat. All of these people and beings are from stories in Greek mythology related to Dionysus.

In the center of the mosaic is the chariot of Dionysus. This part of the mosaic is severely damaged and is missing much of the original piece. What remains of the center is the eight-spoked wheel of a chariot car that is piled with the garlands of Dionysus's chariot. Behind the chariot is the illustration of a panther with a red strap; the purpose of the pictured red strap is unknown. Dionysus is often depicted wearing the skin of a panther, and usually wore this article of clothing during times of war

== Materials ==
The artist(s) of this piece used baked clay, natural stone, and marble tesserae to create the mosaic. The color palette consists of black, brown, green, pink, red, white, and yellow. Mosaics were a very popular type of floor art throughout the Byzantine Empire.

== Meaning ==
There are several theories as to why Dionysus and his entourage were depicted in a Byzantine home. The first is the influence of the Dionysiaca of Nonnus of Panopolis, one of the only surviving poems of Dionysus from the 5th century. It was common during this era to use manuscripts, such as the Dionysiaca, as muses for art pieces like the Dionysus mosaic. Dionysiaca gives a detailed account of Dionysus's life, and includes characters depicted in the mosaic; the characters are also considered to be a part of the Dionysian cycle. The adventurous nature of the poem could be considered a reason for the depiction of Dionysus in this Byzantine mosaic.

Another reason for Dionysus's appearance in the mosaic is the item he is most affiliated with wine. The mosaic is showcased in what would have been a reception room of a wealthy person, where lavish parties would have been thrown. Dionysus is often pictured in manuscripts and illustrations hosting drinking parties, which could have been the reason for including the god of wine and his thiasos in the room where guests would have been entertained.
