= Thiasus (mythology) =

In Greek mythology, Thiasus or Thiasos (Ancient Greek: Θίασός means 'Bacchic revel, rout') may refer to:

- Thiasus, one of the leaders of the satyrs who joined the army of Dionysus in his campaign against India.
- Thiasus, the ecstatic retinue of Dionysus.
