= Naucratis =

City of Ancient Egypt, on the Canopic branch of the Nile river

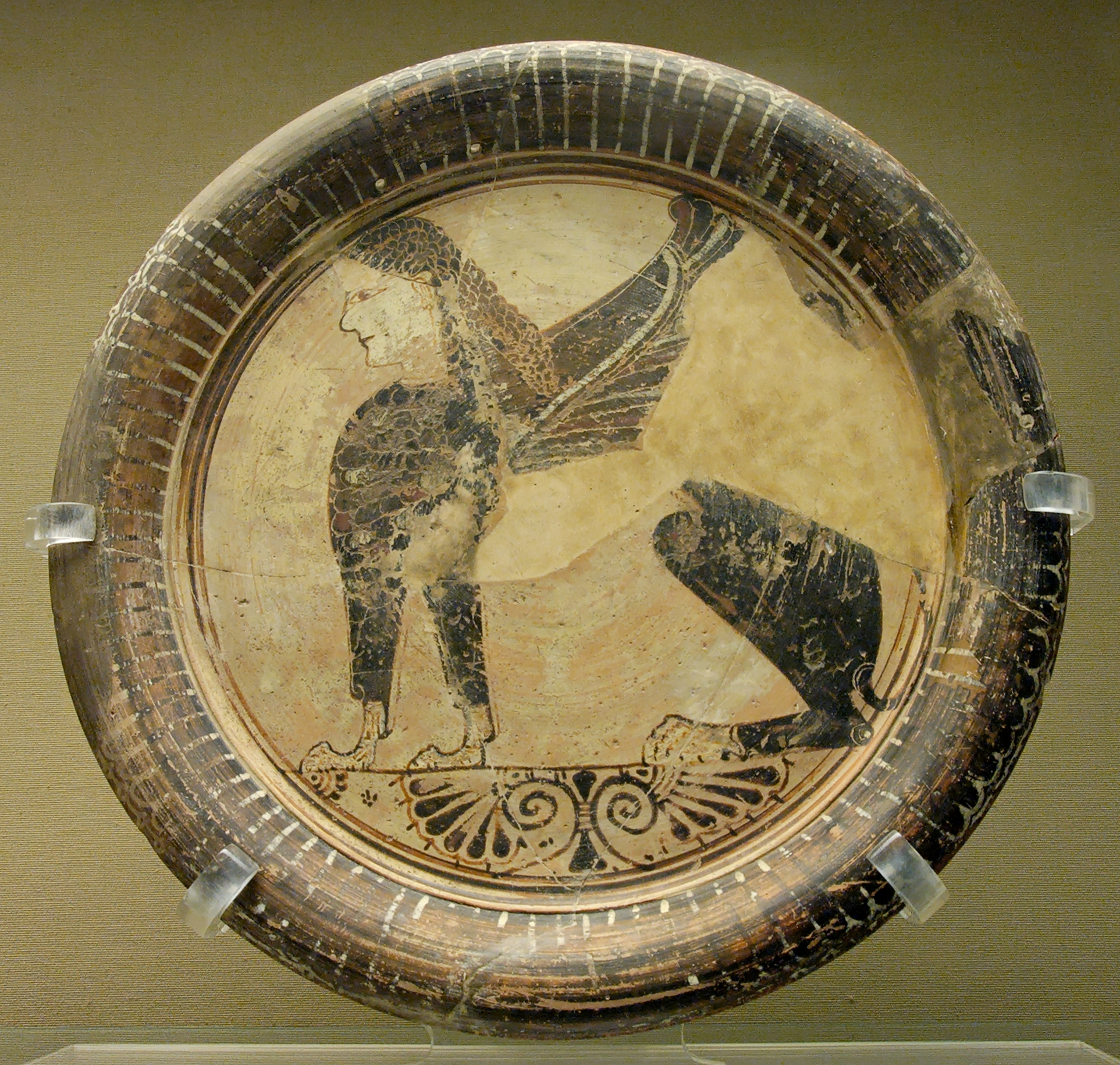
- Seated sphinx plate, Eastern Greek Orientalizing, 6th century BC, from Naukratis

- Location within Egypt
- 30°54′04″N 30°35′33″E
- Type: Settlement
- Associated with: Athenaeus
- Location: Beheira Governorate, Egypt
- Region: Lower Egypt

Naucratis or Naukratis (/ˈnɔːkrətɪs/; Ancient Greek: Ναύκρατις, "Naval Command"; Egyptian: njwt-kꜣrṯ, nskꜣrṯ, pr-mryt; Coptic: Ⲡⲓⲉⲙⲣⲱ Piemro) was a city and trading-post in ancient Egypt, located on the Canopic (western-most) branch of the Nile river, south-east of the Mediterranean Sea and the city of Alexandria. Naucratis was the first and, for much of its early history, the only permanent Greek settlement in Egypt, serving as a symbiotic nexus for the interchange of Greek and Egyptian art and culture.

The modern villages of Kom Gi'eif, el-Nibeira and el-Niqrash cover the archaeological site, which is of great importance. It is the source of numerous art objects in many of the world's museums, as well as pottery inscribed with some of the earliest known examples of Greek writing.

The sister port of Naucratis was the harbour town of Heracleion, which was discovered in 2000.

== Background ==
Archaeological evidence suggests that the history of the ancient Greeks in Egypt dates back at least to Mycenaean times (1600–1100 BC) and more likely even further back into the proto-Greek Minoan age. This history is strictly one of commerce as no permanent Greek settlements have been found of these cultures to date.

After the collapse of Mycenaean Greek civilization and the ensuing Greek Dark Ages (c. 1100–750 BC), a "renaissance" of Greek culture flourished in the 7th century BC—with it came renewed contact with the East and its two great river civilizations of Mesopotamia and the Nile.

Map indicating location of Naucratis—the Nile delta has shifted since ancient days; the city was situated directly on the Canopic (westernmost) branch.

The first report of Greeks in 7th century BC Egypt is a story in the Histories of Herodotus of Ionian and Carian pirates forced by storm to land on or near the Nile Delta. It relates the plight of the Saite Pharaoh Psammetichus I (Psamtik) (c. 664–610) of the Twenty-sixth dynasty of Egypt overthrown and in desperation seeking the advice of the Oracle of Leto at Buto, who cryptically advises him to enlist the aid of the "bronze men" who would "come from the sea." Inspired upon seeing the bronze armor of the shipwrecked pirates, he offers them rewards in return for their aid in his campaign of return to power. Upon the success of this endeavor, he makes good on his word and bestows on the mercenaries two parcels of land (or "camps," στρατόπεδα) on either side of the Pelusiac branch of the Nile.

At present, these sites remain uncertain but this may be a reference to the city of Daphnae.

== History ==
Naukratis was the site of an Egyptian town before the Greeks arrived, later becoming established as a military settlement occupied by mercenaries. Naukratis was located on the Canopic branch of the Nile in the western Delta some 16 km from Sais. The Canopic tributary was one of the major waterways linking the Nile valley with the Mediterranean, and the most accessible of the Nile's tributaries during the Saite Period. The early settlement then developed into a busy trading port. They exchanged goods with the Greeks and with other Mediterranean states. Greeks traders settled in Naukratis and a large Greek community began to develop.

=== Ancient sources ===
In 570 BC, the Pharaoh Apries (Wahibre, reigned 589–570 BC) led the descendants of his mercenary army made up of 30,000 Carians and Ionians against a former general turned rebel by the name of Amasis. Although fighting valiantly, the mercenaries suffered defeat and Amasis II became Pharaoh (reigning 570–526 BC). Amasis shut down the "camps" and moved the Greek soldiers to Memphis, where they were employed "to guard him against the native Egyptians."

Herodotus stated that "Amasis was partial to the Greeks, and among other favors which he granted them, gave to such as liked to settle in Egypt the city of Naucratis for their residence." Notice that he says "gave the city (πόλῐν)," which seems to indicate the existence (now borne out by archaeological evidence) of a "city" already there. This older city was probably a small settlement inhabited by a mix of native Egyptians, Greeks and possibly even Phoenicians. Thus it seems the city was "chartered" to the Greeks soon after 570 BC. The earlier date of c. 625 BC put forward by archaeologists may be the original establishment of a settlement at the site.

Amasis indeed converted Naucratis into a major treaty-port and commercial link with the west. This was most likely done as a means to contain Greek activities in one place under his control. It became not the colony of any particular city-state but an open emporion (trading post) similar to Al Mina in north Syria.

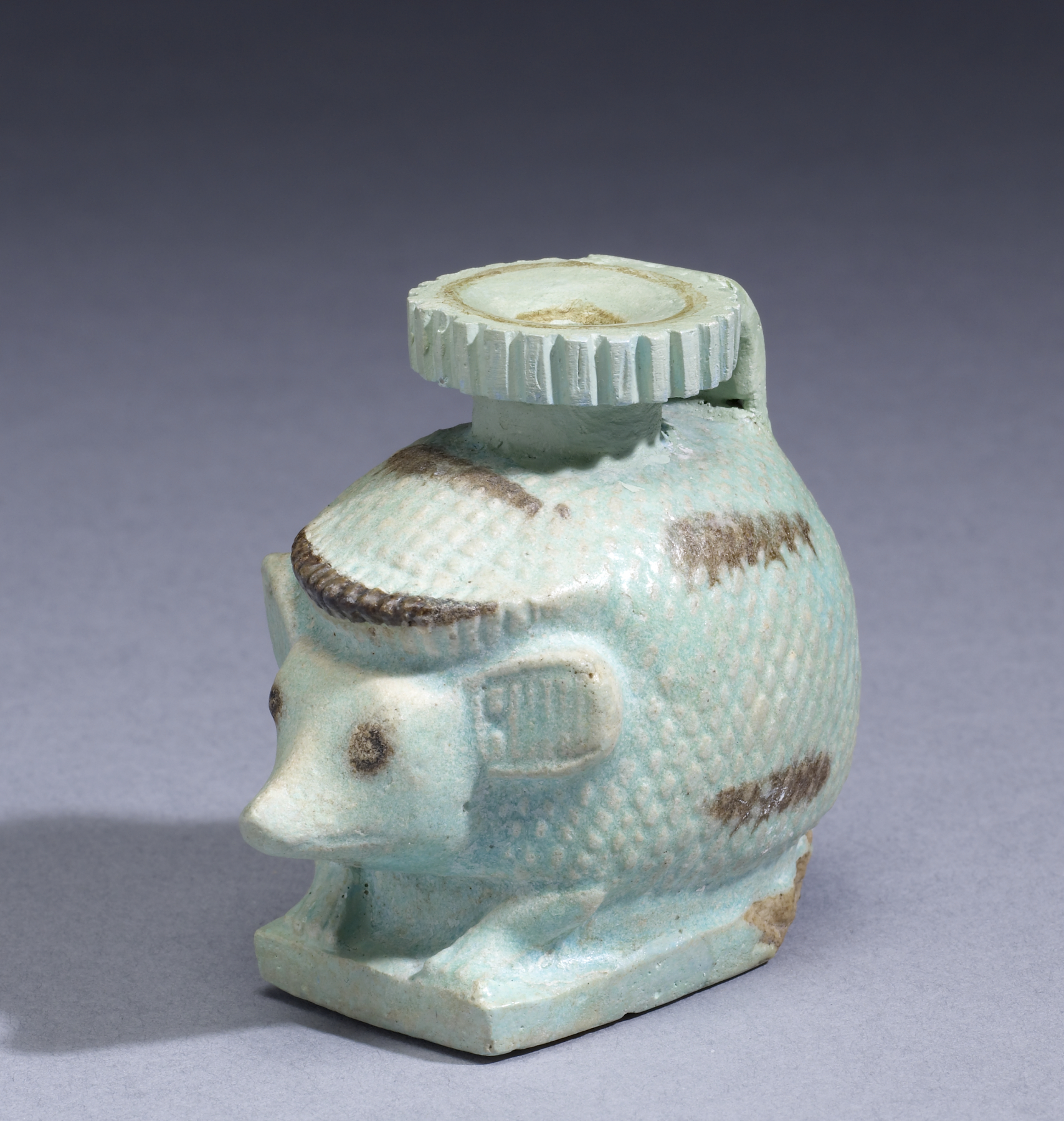
Hedgehog vase from Naukratis

According to Herodotus, the walled shrine known as the Hellenion was a co-operative enterprise financed by nine eastern Greek cities:

- Four Ionian: Chios, Klazomenai, Teos and Phocaea;
- Four Dorian: Rhodes, Halicarnassus, Knidos and Phaselis;
- One Aeolian: Mytilene;
- Miletus, Samos and Aegina also had their own sanctuaries.

Thus the natives of at least twelve Greek city-states worked in a rare long-term collaboration.

Naucratis later became an important center of Greek culture under the Roman Empire, producing several celebrated orators of the Second Sophistic in the second and early third centuries AD. The third century writer Athenaeus came from Naucratis. In the Deipnosophistae, he writes that in Naucratis the people dine in the Prytaneion on the natal day of the Hestia Prytanitis (Ancient Greek: Ἑστίας Πρυτανίτιδος).

== Archaeology ==
niwt kA r T niwt or niwt t kA r T niwt
njwt-kꜣrṯ
in hieroglyphs

n z kA r T niwt
nskꜣrṯ
in hieroglyphs

pr Z1 mr t i i n n n or pr mr t n n n
pr-mryt
in hieroglyphs

The site was rediscovered by Flinders Petrie, who dug there in 1884–1885. He was followed by Ernest Arthur Gardner in 1899 and David George Hogarth in 1903. Hogarth was assisted by Campbell Cowan Edgar.

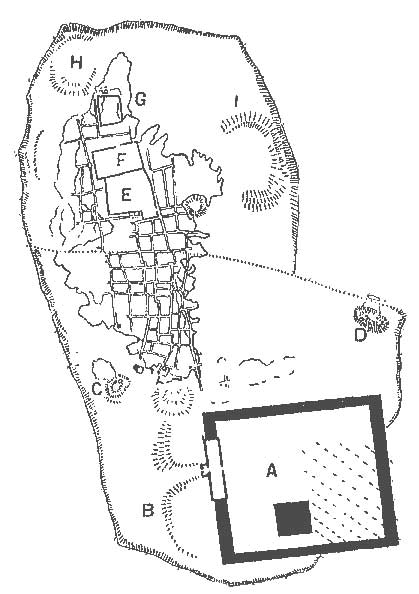
Petrie's sketch plan of Naucratis

The archaeological focus fell into two areas of northern and southern quarters. Found farthest south was a large Egyptian storehouse or treasury (A on sketch at right—originally identified by Petrie as the "great temenos") and just north of that a Greek mud-brick Temple of Aphrodite roughly 14 m × 8 m (curiously not mentioned in Herodotus' list.) Directly east of this temple was unearthed a small factory for faience scarab seals.

In the northern section were found several temple ruins (E: Temple of Hera, F: Temple of Apollo & G: Temple of Dioscuri) including what may be Herodotus' Hellenion discovered by Hogarth in 1899 (directly east of F). "None of the votive pottery found here need have arrived earlier than the reign of Amasis, so it may well be that the Hellenion was founded as the result of his reorganization of the status of Naucratis, while the independent sanctuaries ... are of the earlier years of the town."

More recently, the American archaeologists W. Coulson and A. Leonard founded "The Naucratis Project" in 1977 carrying out surveys in 1977–1978 and further surveys and excavations to the south of the site from 1980–1982 (under the auspices of the American Research Center in Egypt). Unfortunately they found the original northern sanctuary section submerged under a lake formed by the risen water table and roughly 15 m deep. This part of the site remains under water today, making further work there difficult if not impossible. Their assessment of the approach taken and methods used by their predecessors was less than complimentary. "Unfortunately, much of the emphasis of the early excavators was placed on these religious structures at the expense of the commercial and domestic quarters. Consequently our knowledge of the mercantile character of ancient Naukratis—the very facet of its early history that made it so exceptional—has suffered greatly. Furthermore, the later historical sequences, such as the Hellenistic and Roman periods, were almost totally neglected." Also discouraging to them was the destruction wrought by the local populace on the site. "Already in Petrie's day about a third of the half-mile by quarter-mile site of Naukratis had been dug away by the local farmers for use as high-phosphate fertilizer (sebakh) in their fields.... In the intervening 100 years or so, the sebakhin have totally destroyed this eastern portion of the site." The barrier of the high water table made it impossible for them to find anything older than the Ptolemaic era. They agreed with Hogarth that the "great temenos" of Petrie was actually an Egyptian building and that indeed the entire south section of the town appeared to be non-Greek. Overall most of the finds were vases (some whole, most fragmentary) used as votives in the temples, but also perfume flasks (several in the form of a hedgehog) and stone statuettes and scarab seals. These are scattered to museums and collections around the world, the earlier material largely brought to Britain (mostly in the British Museum) and the latter to the Graeco-Roman Museum in Alexandria.

The British Museum conducted a project from 2012 to 2023 to review the original findings from the 19th and 20th centuries as well as to conduct new field studies. This work resulted in an accurate topographic map of the site and correlate findings from all the archaeological studies of the area to create a more complete history of Naucratis.

== Impact ==
The Egyptians mostly supplied the Greeks with grain but also provided linen and papyrus, while the Greeks mostly bartered silver but also timber, olive oil and wine. Naukratis, and the associated Greek "forts" in the general delta area, as demonstrated by accounts given above, became a ready source of mercenary fighting men for the Saite pharaohs, men with superior hoplite armor and tactics, also possessing invaluable naval expertise.

Naucratis soon became a profound source of inspiration to the Greeks by re-exposing them to the wonders of Egyptian architecture and sculpture lost to them since the Bronze Age. Egyptian artifacts soon began their flow along the Greek trade routes finding their way into the homes and workshops of the Ionian Greek world and, via Aegina, the city-states of mainland Greece. Although Greek art and ideas in turn came back the other way their absorption into a largely xenophobic Egyptian culture was strictly minimal.

Although Herodotus claimed that geometry (γεωμετρία) was first known in Egypt and then passed into Greece, it is now generally accepted by scholars that what the Greeks learned were more like "surveying techniques" and hardly deserve the designation "geometry" in the sense of a purely intellectual mathematical practice. Indeed, Greeks like Thales were already accomplished geometricians before their travel to Egypt and very likely Herodotus assumed that because the Egyptian γεωμετρία was older, the Greeks must have got it from there.

In terms of our modern understanding of the Greeks, and in particular the early use of their nascent Greek alphabet, the finds of Naucratis have turned out to be foundational. "The inscriptions on the pottery have yielded what Mr. Ernest Gardner considers—apparently on firm grounds—to be the oldest Ionic inscriptions, as well as some in the Korinthian, Melian, and Lesbian alphabets." Of particular interest are the several examples of an evolutionary variation from the original Phoenician alphabetic script. Much has also been learned by comparing these alphabets with the forms they assumed a century later, forms that were destined to become universal across the Hellenic world.

Naucratis was not only the first Greek settlement in Egypt but also Egypt's most important harbor in antiquity until the rise of Alexandria and the shifting of the Nile led to its decline. Nevertheless, the ancient city of Heracleion/Thonis also rivalled Naucratis as an important port city of Egypt, especially from the 6th to the 4th century BC.

== See also ==
- Cleomenes of Naucratis
- Colonies in antiquity
- Decree of Nectanebo I, originally known as the 'Stele of Naukratis'. Issued by Nectanebo I
- List of ancient Egyptian towns and cities
- Proclus of Naucratis
