= Proculus (praenomen) =

Latin name

This page is about the Latin praenomen. For the 3rd-century usurper, see Proculus. For any of several saints named Proculus, see Saint Proculus (disambiguation).

Proculus is a Latin praenomen, or personal name, which was most common during the early centuries of the Roman Republic. It gave rise to the patronymic gentes Proculeia and Procilia, and later became a common cognomen, or surname. The feminine form is Procula. The name was not regularly abbreviated.

== Use ==
Proculus was an uncommon name, but was occasionally used by both patrician and plebeian families. Those known to have used it included the Geganii, Julii, Sertorii, and Verginii; and naturally Proculus must once have been used by the ancestors of the gentes Proculeia and Procilia. Other families which later used the name as a cognomen may originally have used it as a praenomen.

The scholar Varro described Proculus as an archaic praenomen, which was no longer in general use by the first century BC. As a cognomen, however, Proculus was still common, and it became even more so during imperial times.

== Origin and meaning ==
According to Festus, the name Proculus was originally given to children who were born while their fathers were away. This explanation is also found in Plutarch. Chase believes that this is a false etymology, and points out that the praenomen appears to be a diminutive of another word, such as procus. The usual translation of this word is "suitor", but Festus also mentions that procus was an archaic form of procer, a prince.

Another possibility is that Proculus is a diminutive of Proca, the name of one of the kings of Alba Longa. In that case, Proca would also be an ancient praenomen. Of course, it is entirely possible that Proca is derived from the same root as procus and procer.
