= Pietro Scandellari =

Italian painter

Pietro Scandellari (1711–1789) was an Italian painter and scenic designer.

He was born in Bologna, and trained under Francesco Galli Bibiena, mainly as a decorative painter for churches. His brothers Giuseppe and Giulio were also painters. The brothers Filippo (1717–1801) and Giacomo Antonio were sculptors. Filippo studied under his father, the sculptor Giacomo Scandellari, and later Angelo Pio. Filippo was named to the Clementine Academy.

He painted a Nativity at San Mattia in Bologna with Pietro Faccini and Niccola Bertuzzi.

At the Basilica di Santa Maria dei Servi of Bologna, he painted ornament around a painting by Vittorio Bigari. One of his pupils was Giuseppe Jarmorini. He also painted in the church of San Procolo, Bologna.
