= Bridgeness Slab =

Roman distance slab created around 142 CE

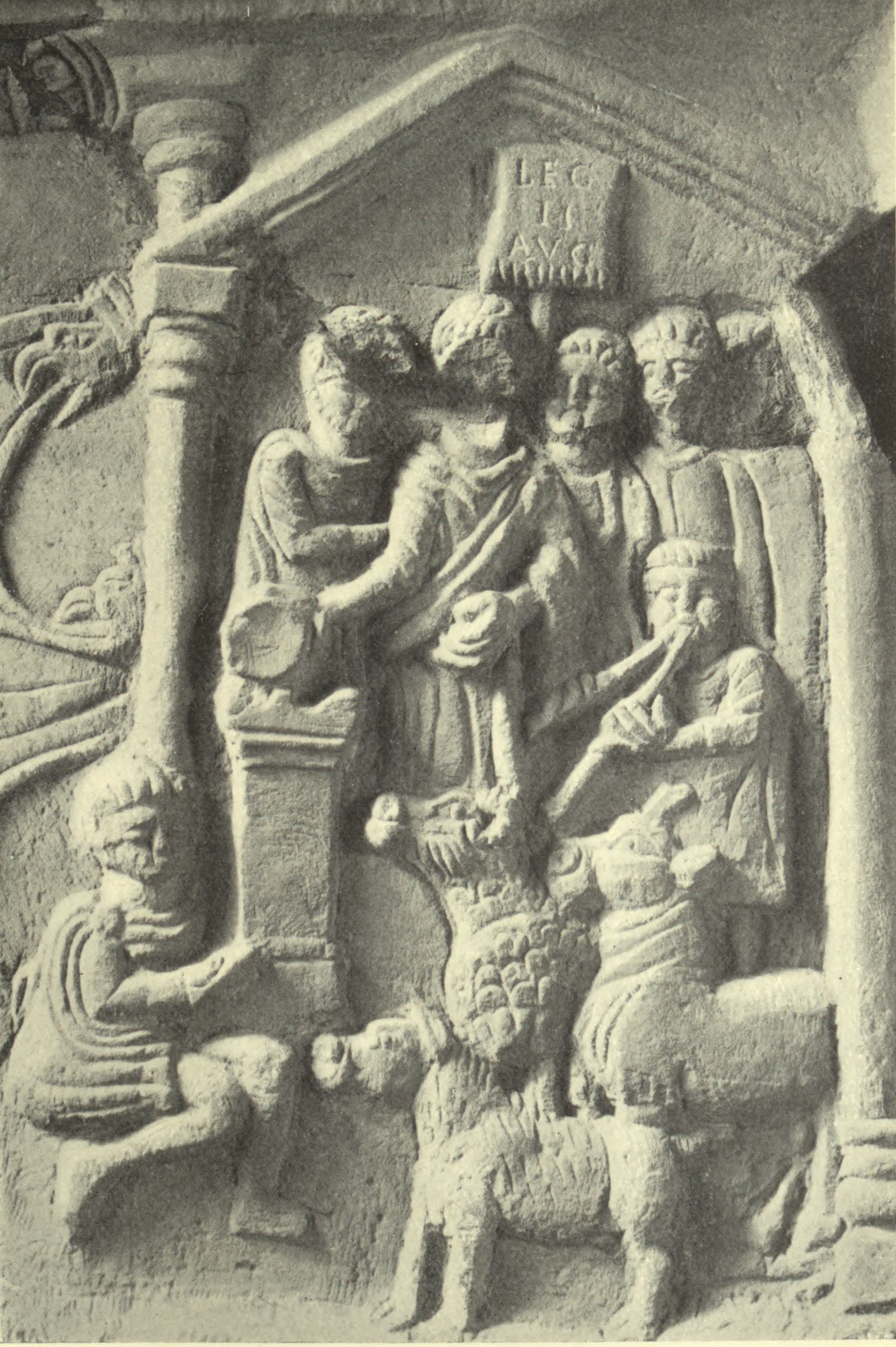
Suovetaurilia on the right panel of the Bridgeness Slab

The Bridgeness Slab is a Roman distance slab created around 142 CE marking a portion of the Antonine Wall built by the Second Legion. It is regarded as the most detailed and best preserved of the Scottish distance slabs. The sandstone tablet was found at Bridgeness in Bo'ness, Scotland in 1868 on a promontory close to Harbour Road. The original is in the National Museum of Scotland in Edinburgh, while a replica is near the site of its discovery.

== History ==
The slab was erected 142 CE to mark the completion of a section of the Antonine Wall. It was uncovered during excavations in 1868 on land owned by Henry Mowbray Cadell, whose son Dr Henry Cadell was an eyewitness of its discovery. Cadell offered it to the Society of Antiquaries of Scotland for display in the National Museum of Scotland in Edinburgh if they would provide a copy for display locally.

The first on-site replica includes only the centre panel of the original. A second replica, including the side panels, was unveiled by Bo'ness Community Council and Falkirk Council on 7 September 2012 at 56°0′58.45″N 3°35′1.31″W in Kinningars Park, Bridgeness, Bo'ness. The replica was based on the original as was an older copy of the stone now in the Hunterian Museum. The Bo'ness replica was made using digital laser scanning since silicone or other moulds risked damaging the slab.

== Description ==
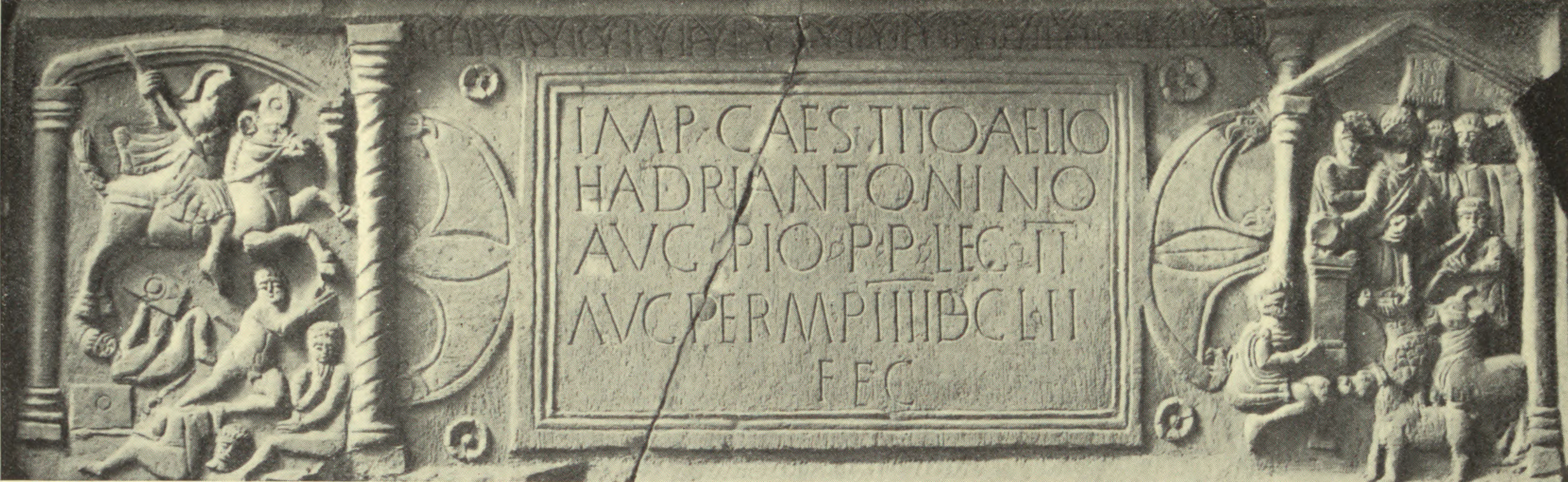
The Bridgeness Slab in 1911, before repairs.

Made of sandstone and measuring 9 ft 2ins long by 2 ft 11ins high, the slab is divided into three sections. The inscription in the centre panel reads "Imp CaesTito Aelio / Hadri Antonino Aug Pio p p legII Aug / per m p ĪĪĪĪ DCLII / FEC", which when expanded reads as "Imp(eratori) Caes(ari) Tito Aelio Hadri(ano) Antonino/ Aug(usto) Pio p(atri) p(atriae) leg(io) II Aug(usta) per m(ilia) p(assuum) IIII(milia)DCLII fec(it)". In English this translates as "For the Emperor Caesar Titus Aelius Hadrianus Antoninus Augustus Pius, Father of his Country, the Second Augustan Legion completed [the Wall] over a distance of 4652 paces".

In addition to the Latin inscription the original has sculpted panels.

On the left is a victorious, Roman cavalryman with four naked Britons: one being trampled holding a shield, one running with a spear in his back, one sitting in apparent despair, and one of whom is bound and beheaded. It has been suggested that the last act was a show of contempt for Gallo-Briton head veneration. The propaganda, particularly Roman depiction of natives is consistent with other slabs like the ones from Balmuildy and Westerwood.

On the right panel is a depiction of the suovetaurilia, a ceremony undertaken before important campaigns or in this case before the wall was built. The arched top of a temple is depicted. Four soldiers are shown, one carrying the vexillum, or cavalry flag, of the Second Legion. A man in a toga, possibly Aulus Claudius Charax, commander of the Second Legion, is depicted pouring a libation on an altar as a preliminary to sacrificing a bull, a pig and a sheep. The sounds of the slaughter may have been drowned out by the musical instruments which are shown being played. The inscription records the building of 4652 paces of the Antonine Wall.

Washing revealed faint traces of pigments, mainly red, have survived on the original stone suggesting that it was once highly coloured.

== Similar slabs ==
The slab is reminiscent of one from Summerston, now in the Hunterian Museum in Glasgow, which was also made by the Second Legion and which similarly depicts a helmeted horseman and naked captives. Other distance slabs by the Second Legion have been mapped with RTI and include one from Balmuildy and another from Duntocher. Both of these items are now kept in the Hunterian Museum.
