= Giuseppe Jarmorini =

Italian painter

Giuseppe Jarmorini (1730–1816) was an Italian painter, mainly of decorative painting, during the Neoclassical period.

== Biography ==
He was active in his native Bologna. His artistic training was under Pietro Scandellari. Jarmorini was a member of Accademia Clementina.
