= Themison of Laodicea =

Themison of Laodicea (Greek: Θεμίσων, gen. Θεμίσωνος; 123 BC – 43 BC) was the founder of the Methodic school of medicine, and one of the most eminent physicians of his time.

== Biography ==
Themison was a native of Laodicea in Syria, and a pupil of Asclepiades of Bithynia. He had a son, Proclus of Laodicea. Nothing more is known about the events of his life except that he seems to have travelled a great deal; as he mentions Crete and Milan, apparently as an eye-witness. Neither is it certain if he ever visited Rome, though it is perhaps more probable that he did so. He differed from his teacher on several points in his old age, and became the founder of a new sect called the Methodic school (Methodici), which long exercised an extensive influence on medical science. He wrote several medical works, but in what language is not mentioned; of these only the titles and a few fragments remain, preserved principally by Caelius Aurelianus, for example: Libri Periodici; Epistolae in at least nine books; Celeres Passiones in at least two books; Tardae Passiones in at least two books; Liber Salutaria; De Plantagine.

He was perhaps the first physician who made use of leeches, and he is said to have been attacked with hydrophobia, and to have recovered. Eudemus and Proculus are said to have been followers (Latin: sectatores) of Themison, which may only mean that they belonged to the Methodic school.

Themison was criticized by Soranus for his cruel handling of mental patients. Among his prescriptions were darkness, restraint by chains, and deprivation of food and drink. Juvenal satirized a physician by the name of Themison and suggested that he killed more patients than he cured, but whether he means this Themison, or some contemporary, is unknown.

== Sources ==
- Greenhill, Willlam Alexander. “Themison.” In Dictionary of Greek and Roman Biography and Mythology, edited by William Smith, 3:1023–24. Boston, Mass.: Little, Brown & Co., 1870.
