= Proclus of Rhegium =

Proclus or Proklos (Greek: Πρόκλος; 1st century AD), probably a native of Rhegium in Magna Graecia, was a physician among the Bruttii in Italy. He belonged to the medical sect of the Methodici. He must have lived about the end of the 1st century, as he was junior to Thessalus and senior to Galen. He is no doubt the same physician who is called Proculus in our present editions of Caelius Aurelianus, where he is said to have been one of the followers of Themison, and his opinion on the different kinds of dropsy is quoted. He may also be the same person whose remedy for the gout and sciatica is mentioned by Paul of Aegina and Joannes Actuarius.
