= Suovetaurilia =

Ancient Roman sacrifice

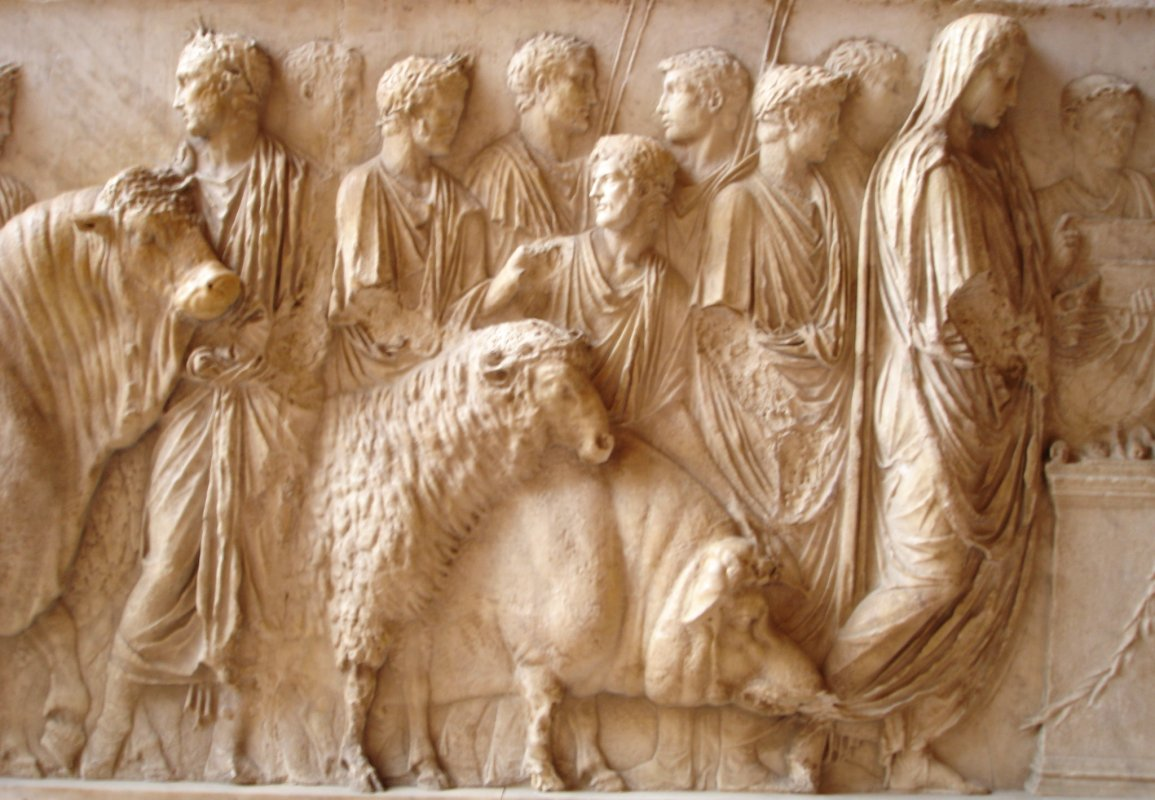

The suovetaurilia or suovitaurilia was one of the most sacred and traditional rites of Roman religion: the sacrifice of a pig (sus), a sheep (ovis) and a bull (taurus) to the deity Mars to bless and purify land (Lustratio).

== Ritual ==
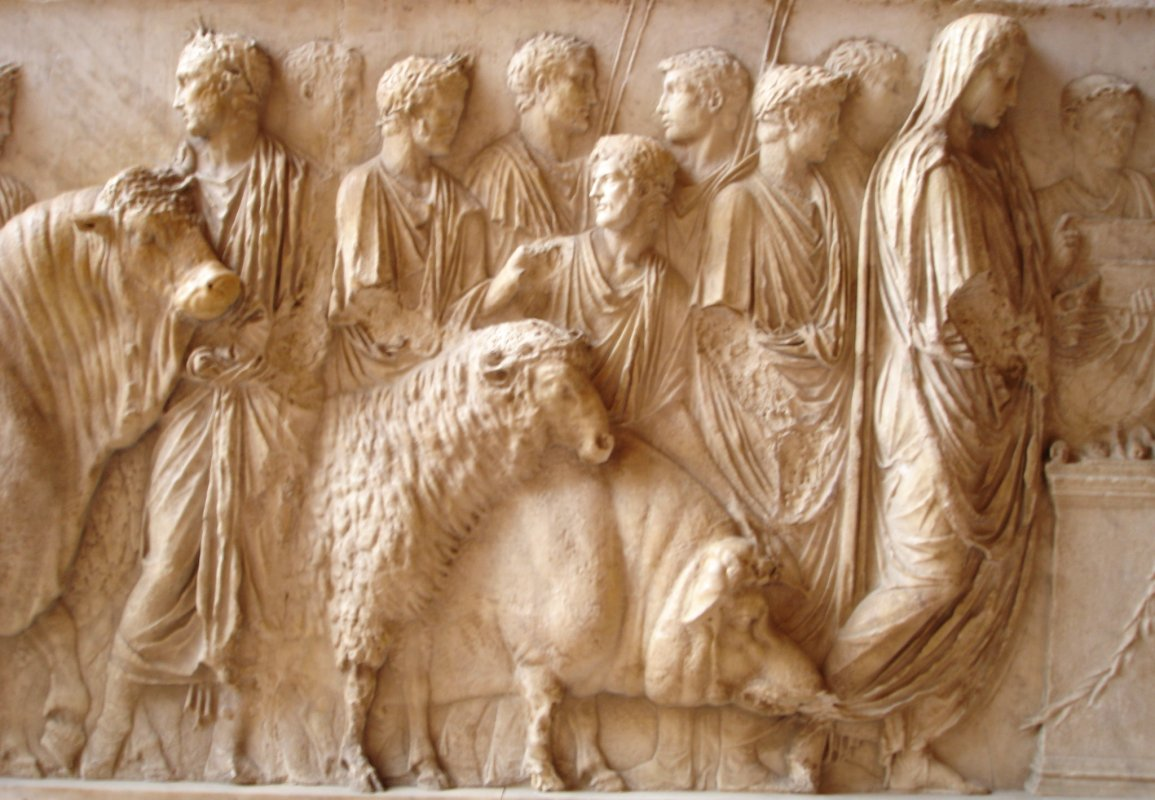
The suovetaurilia was an ancient Roman sacrifice where in which a pig, sheep, and a bull were sacrificed.

There were two kinds:

- suovetaurilia lactentia ("suckling suovetaurilia") of a male pig, a lamb and a calf, for purifying private fields
- suovetaurilia maiora ("greater suovtaurilia") of a boar, a ram and a bull, for public ceremonies.

The ritual for private fields is preserved in Cato the Elder's De Agri Cultura, "On Agriculture". It was performed each May on the festival of Ambarvalia, a festival that involved "walking around the fields." Public suovetaurilias were offered at certain state ceremonies, including agricultural festivals, the conclusion of a census, and to atone for any accidental ritual errors. Traditionally, suovetaurilias were performed at five year intervals: this period was called a lustrum, and the purification sought by a suovetaurilia was called lustration.

If a temple were destroyed, the site of the temple must be purified by a suovetaurilia before a new temple could be reconstructed on the site. When the Capitolium was burnt as a result of a struggle for imperial succession in the year 69, a suovetaurilia was performed to reconsecrate the site. A public suovetaurilia was also offered to bless the army before a major military campaign. On Trajan's Column, the emperor Trajan is depicted as offering a suovetaurilia to purify the Roman army. A suovetaurilia is shown on the right hand panel of The Bridgeness Slab. It was suggested that the sacrifice might have been made at the start of the building of the Antonine Wall.

== Performance of the suovetaurilia lactentia ==
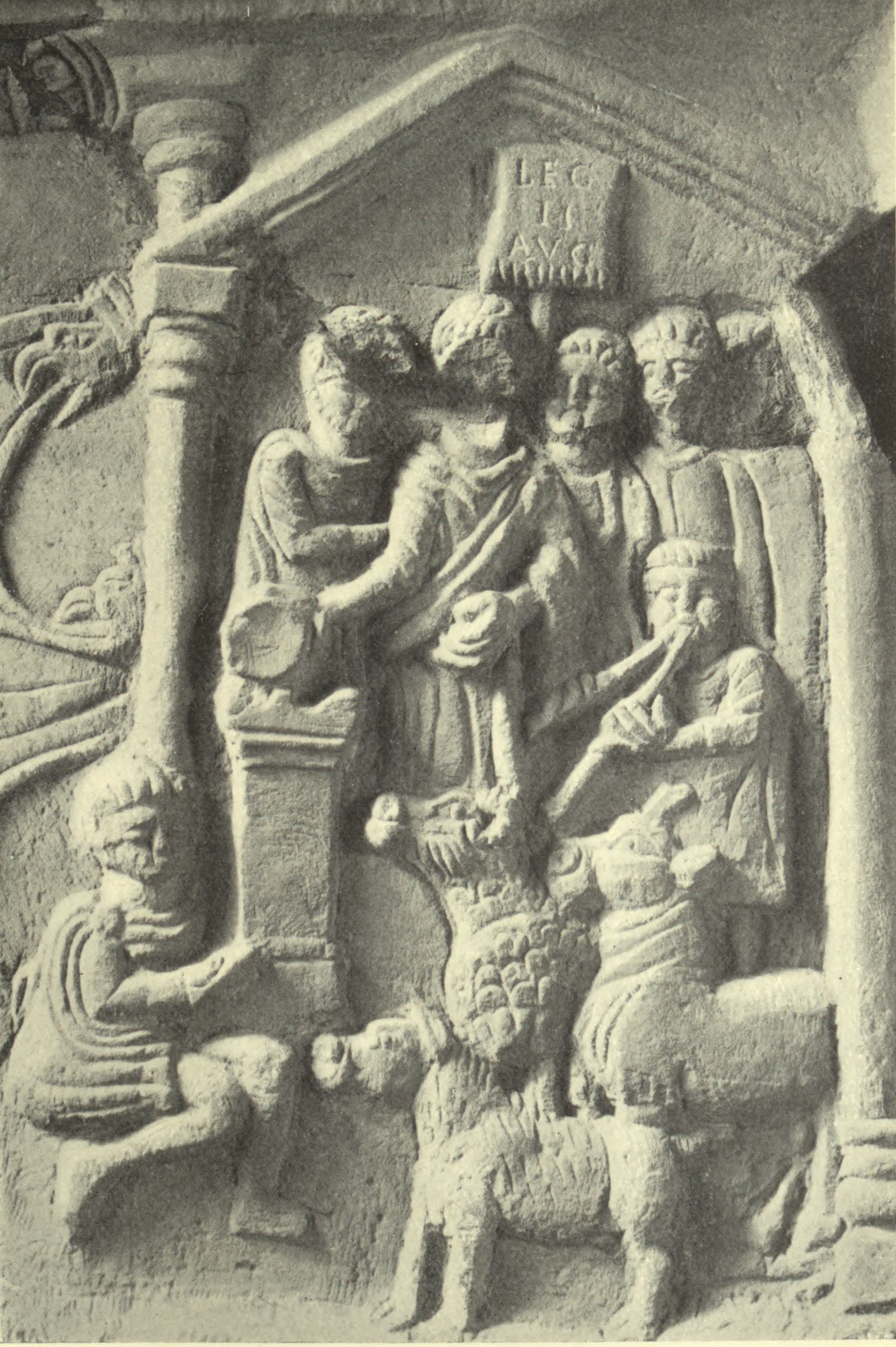
Right hand panel of The Bridgeness Slab showing a suovetaurilia.

=== Circumambulation ===
The first step was to lead the three animals around the boundaries of the land to be blessed, pronouncing the following words:

Cum divis volentibus quodque bene eveniat, mando tibi, Mani, uti illace suovitaurilia fundum agrum terramque meam quota ex parte sive circumagi sive circumferenda censeas, uti cures lustrare.

"That with the good help of the gods success may crown our work, I bid thee, Manius, to take care to purify my farm, my land, my ground with this suovetaurilia, in whatever part thou thinkest best for them to be driven or carried around."

"Manius" in this passage has been interpreted as a slave, land manager, soothsayer, or perhaps generic name, possibly equivalent to English John Doe. Alternatively, the classicist Roger Woodard proposes that this "Manius" may have functioned as the masculine equivalent of the chthonic goddess Mania. According to Woodard, this god Manius may be identical with the Manius described by the 1st-century BCE Roman author Varro, who writes that—according to another author named Procilius—a crack opened in the earth at the Lacus Curtius, and then the haruspices reported that a god named Manius demanded that the bravest Roman citizen must plunge into the hole. If the interpretation of "Manius" as a god is accepted, then it is perhaps unusual for Cato to issue direct commands to the divinity, saying "I bid you, Manius" ("Mando, tibi Mani"). It may perhaps parallel Hittite traditions, wherein another chthonic deity—the Sun goddess of the Earth—can also be addressed without much adoration or respect. The presence of underworld themes in the suovetaurilia would connect with the Old Indic Sautramani rite, another tripartite sacrifice in which libations are offered to the Pitri, spirits of the deceased, to ensure their purification.

=== Sacrificial prayer ===
Cato instructs that, prior to the sacrifice, the suppliant must perform a libation to Janus and Jupiter also must utter an extended prayer to Mars. The prayer is written in an archaic metrical and incantatory form; even in Old Latin, the prayer contains many rhetorical figures such as alliteration and liberal use of merisms and antithesis. It illustrates the metrical and poetic format of polytheistic prayers. Calvert Watkins versifies the text as follows:

Mars pater, te precor quaesoque
uti sies volens propitious
mihi domo familiaeque nostrae,
quoius re ergo
agrum terram fundumque meum
suovitaurilia circumagi iussi;

uti tu
morbos visos invisosque,
viduertatem vastitudinemque,
calamitates intemperiasque
prohibessis defendas averruncesque;

utique tu
fruges, frumenta, vineta virgultaque
grandire beneque evenire siris,
pastores pecuaque salva servassis
duisque bonam salutem valetudinemque
mihi domo familiaeque nostrae;

harumce rerum ergo,
fundi terrae agrique mei
lustrandi lustrique faciendi ergo,
sicuti dixi,
macte hisce suovitaurilibus lactentibus inmolandis esto;
Mars pater, eiusdem rei ergo
macte hisce suovitaurilibus lactentibus esto

Translation:

Father Mars, I pray and beseech thee
that thou be gracious and merciful
to me, my house, and my household;
to which intent
I have bidden this suovetaurilia to be led around
my land, my ground, my farm;

That thou
keep away, ward off, and remove
sickness, seen and unseen,
barrenness and destruction,
ruin and unseasonable influence;

And that thou permit
my harvests, my grain, my vineyards, and my plantations,
to flourish and to come to good issue
preserve in health my shepherds and my flocks,
and give good health and strength
to me, my house, and my household.

To this intent,
to the intent of purifying
my farm, my land, my ground, and of making an expiation,
as I have said,
deign to accept the offering of these suckling victims;
Father Mars, to the same intent
deign to accept the offering of this suckling suovetaurilia."

=== Sacrifice ===
Archaeological excavations at Satricum have revealed evidence of the sacrifice of a sheep or goat, a pig, and a cow dating to between the 5th-3rd centuries BCE. These three species were discovered in 16 out of the 47 small assemblages at the site, which dated between the early 5th-century to c. 375 BCE, and in four of the five large assemblages, which dated between c. 375 – c. 200 BCE. However, the archaeologists Jelle Bouma and Wietske Prummel argue that the number of remains found in each deposit correlates to the number of identified species and thus propose that the majority of deposits once contained bones from all three animal and their absence from the archaeological record is perhaps attributable to "poor preservation and incomplete sampling." In contrast, the archaeologist Marijke Gnade argues that such an explanation is "misleading," as the ratio between the sacrificed animals is consistent throughout Satricum. Ultimately, Gnade concludes that the evidence from this site "cannot be said to support the identification of these offerings as suovetaurilia."

Given the tripartite nature of the suovetaurilia, the ritual has been interpreted as a reflection of the trifunctional hypothesis of Georges Dumézil. Collectively, the three animals perhaps correspond to each of the three supposed functions of Indo-European society. According to Émile Benveniste, the pig—which was sacred to Ceres—represents the fertility of the soil; the sheep and the ram were associated with warriors; and the bull—which was sacred to Jupiter—was otherwise sacrificed in the most important Roman religious rituals, and is therefore connected to the priesthood. However, in other interpretations, it is the bull that was associated with warriors in Indo-European cultures, and it was sacrificed to Mars in the suovetaurilia. According to Jaan Puhvel, the role of the god Mars within the suovetaurilia singularly encompassed all manner of social ill. Mars was invoked to counter three type of misfortune—diseases, blights, and devastation—and he was compelled to enforce his protection through words ("prohibessis"), combat ("defendas"), and agricultural measures ("averrunces").

Cakes of bread were sacrificed along with the three animals. At the moment the sacrifices were made, the landowner was to say:

Eiusque rei ergo macte suovitaurilibus inmolandis esto.

"To this intent deign to accept the offering of these victims."

=== Omens ===
If favourable omens as a response to the sacrifice were not forthcoming, the landowner was instructed to redo the sacrifice and offer a further prayer:

Mars pater, siquid tibi in illisce suovitaurilibus lactentibus neque satisfactum est, te hisce suovitaurilibus piaculo.

"Father Mars, if aught hath not pleased thee in the offering of those sucklings, I make atonement with these victims."

If only one or two of the omens expected after the three sacrifices failed to appear, the landowner was instructed to offer an additional swine, saying:

Mars pater, quod tibi illoc porco neque satisfactum est, te hoc porco piaculo.

"Father Mars, inasmuch as thou wast not pleased by the offering of that pig, I make atonement with this pig."

The nature of the expected omens is not given by Cato. The omens, however, were likely determined by the art of haruspicy, the examination of the entrails, and especially the livers, of sacrificed animals for divinatory signs.

== Parallels ==
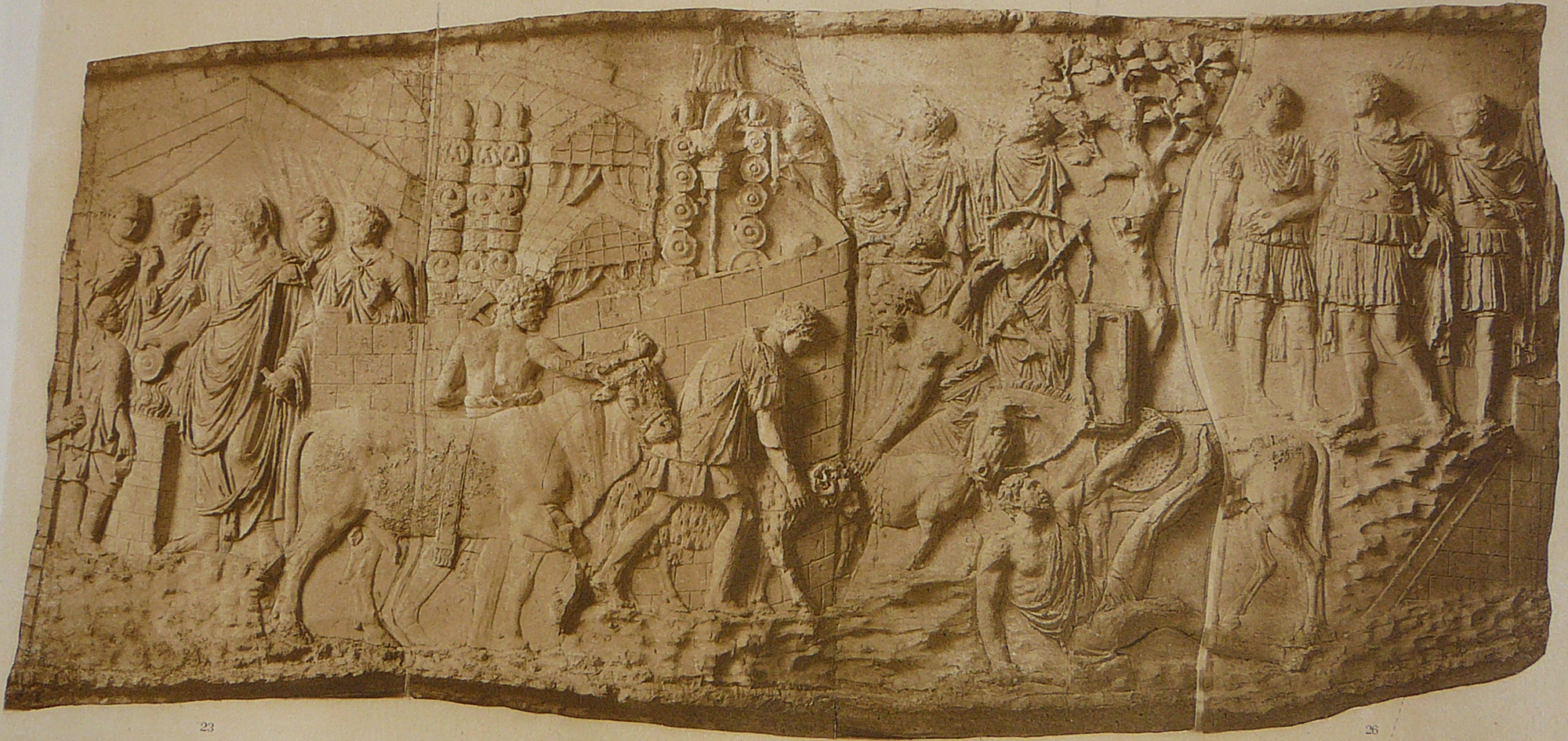
Suovetaurilia in a military setting, from Trajan's Column

Some religious rites similar to the Roman suovetaurilia were practiced by a few other Indo-European peoples, from Iberia to India. The Cabeço das Fráguas inscript (found in Portugal) describes a threefold sacrifice practiced by the Lusitanians, devoting a sheep, a pig and a bull to what may have been local gods. In the Indian Sautramani ritual, a ram, a bull and a goat were sacrificed to Saraswati, Indra, and the Asvins respectively. The name of the Sautramani derives from the title Sutrāman ("good-protector"), an epithet applied to the war god Indra, which parallels the prominence of the war god Mars in the Roman rite. In Iran ten thousand sheep, a thousand cattle and a hundred stallions were dedicated to Ardvi Sura Anahita. Similar to the above rituals is the Greek trittoíai, the oldest known being described in the Odyssey and dedicated to Poseidon. The philosopher and historian Plutarch related in the Lives Of The Noble Greeks And Romans a story from the life of Pyrrhus about the sacrifice of a ram, a pig and a bull. The Umbrian Iguvine Tables also describe a sacrificial ritual related to the aforementioned rites.

== See also ==
- Glossary of Roman religion

== Bibliography ==
- Benveniste, Émile (2016), Dictionary of Indo-European Concepts and Society (PDF), translated by Palmer, Elizabeth, Hau Books, ISBN 9780986132599, LCCN 2016955902
- Dillon, Matthew; Garland, Lynda (2013-10-28). Ancient Rome: A Sourcebook. Routledge. p. 129. ISBN 978-1-136-76143-0.
- Gnade, M. (2000). Satricum in the Post-Archaic Period. A Case study of the Interpretation of Archaeological Remains as Indicators of Ethno-Cultural Identity (Thesis).
- Mallory, James P.; Adams, Douglas Q. (1997). Encyclopedia of Indo-European Culture. London: Routledge. ISBN 978-1-884964-98-5.
- Prummel, Wietske; Bouma, Jelle (1997). "Animal offerings at Borgo Le Ferriere (Latium, Italy) : Postpalaeolithic Europe I" (PDF). Anthropozoologica. Proceedings of the 7th ICAZ conference.
- Puhvel, Jaan (1978). "Victimal Hierarchies in Indo-European Animal Sacrifice". The American Journal of Philology. 99 (3): 354–362. doi:10.2307/293746. ISSN 0002-9475.
- Watkins, Calvert (1995), How to Kill a Dragon: Aspects of Indo-European Poetics (PDF), Oxford University Press, ISBN 0-19-508595-7
- Woodard, Roger D. (2006). Indo-European Sacred Space: Vedic and Roman Cult. University of Illinois Press. doi:10.5406/j.ctt1xcmv6. ISBN 978-0-252-02988-2. JSTOR 10.5406/j.ctt1xcmv6.
