= Michele Mastellari =

Italian painter

- Born: Michele Mastellari
- Known for: Paintings
- Movement: Figurative art

Michele Mastellari was an Italian painter of quadratura, active during the mid-19th century in Bologna.

He often worked with his brother, Francesco (born 1830). He painted in tempera, for the Teatro Contavalli and the Teatro Comunale of Bologna. He painted the ceiling of the church of San Benedetto, the Chiesa degli Angeli, San Sigismondo, the presbytery of the church of Santa Maria del Soccorso; the main chapel of Santa Maria Maggiore, and the cupola and transept of San Procolo. Francesco is known for painting the 2nd and 3rd chapels of the Church of the Misericordia fuori porta Castiglione.
