= Proclus of Naucratis =

Proclus or Proklos (Greek: Πρόκλος) was a teacher of rhetoric and a native of Naucratis in Hellenistic Egypt. He lived in the 2nd century AD.

He was a man of distinction in his native city, but because of the civil commotions there he went to Athens while still young. There he became a pupil of Adrianus, and afterwards taught rhetoric himself. He had Philostratus as one of his pupils. It was his practice to allow anyone who paid down 100 drachmas at once admission to all his lectures. He also had a library which he allowed his pupils to use. In the style of his discourses he imitated Hippias and Gorgias. He was remarkable for the tenacity of his memory, which he retained even in extreme old age.

He possessed several houses in and near Athens, and imported considerable quantities of merchandise from Egypt, which he resold to local vendors. After the death of his wife and son he took a concubine. He entirely surrendered the control of his household to her, and was considerably discredited as a consequence of her mismanagement of it.

(Philostratus, Vita Procli 602 etc., ed. Olearius.)
