= Proclus of Laodicea =

Proclus (Greek: Πρόκλος) or Proculeius, son of the physician Themison, was a hierophant at Laodiceia in Syria. He wrote, according to the Suda, the following works:

- On the gods (θεολογία)
- On the myth of Pandora in Hesiod (εἰς τὴν παρ' Ἡσιόδῳ τῆς Πανδώρας μῦθον)
- On golden words (εἰς τὰ χρυσᾶ ἔπη)
- On Nicomachus' introduction to number theory (εἰς τὴν Νικομάχου εἰσαγωγὴν τῆς ἀριθμητικῆς)
- some geometrical treatises

He is also mentioned by Damascius in a commentary on Plato.

Although a commentary on the Pythagorean Golden Verses, known through a translation into Arabic (in the El Escorial library as manuscript 888) has sometimes been attributed to this Proclus (following a theory promoted by Leendert Gerrit Westerink), this is disputed, and a more widely accepted theory is that the commentary is instead by Proclus Diadochus.

== See also ==
- Proculeia gens
