= San Procolo, Bologna =

Roman Catholic Church in Bologna, Italy

San Procolo
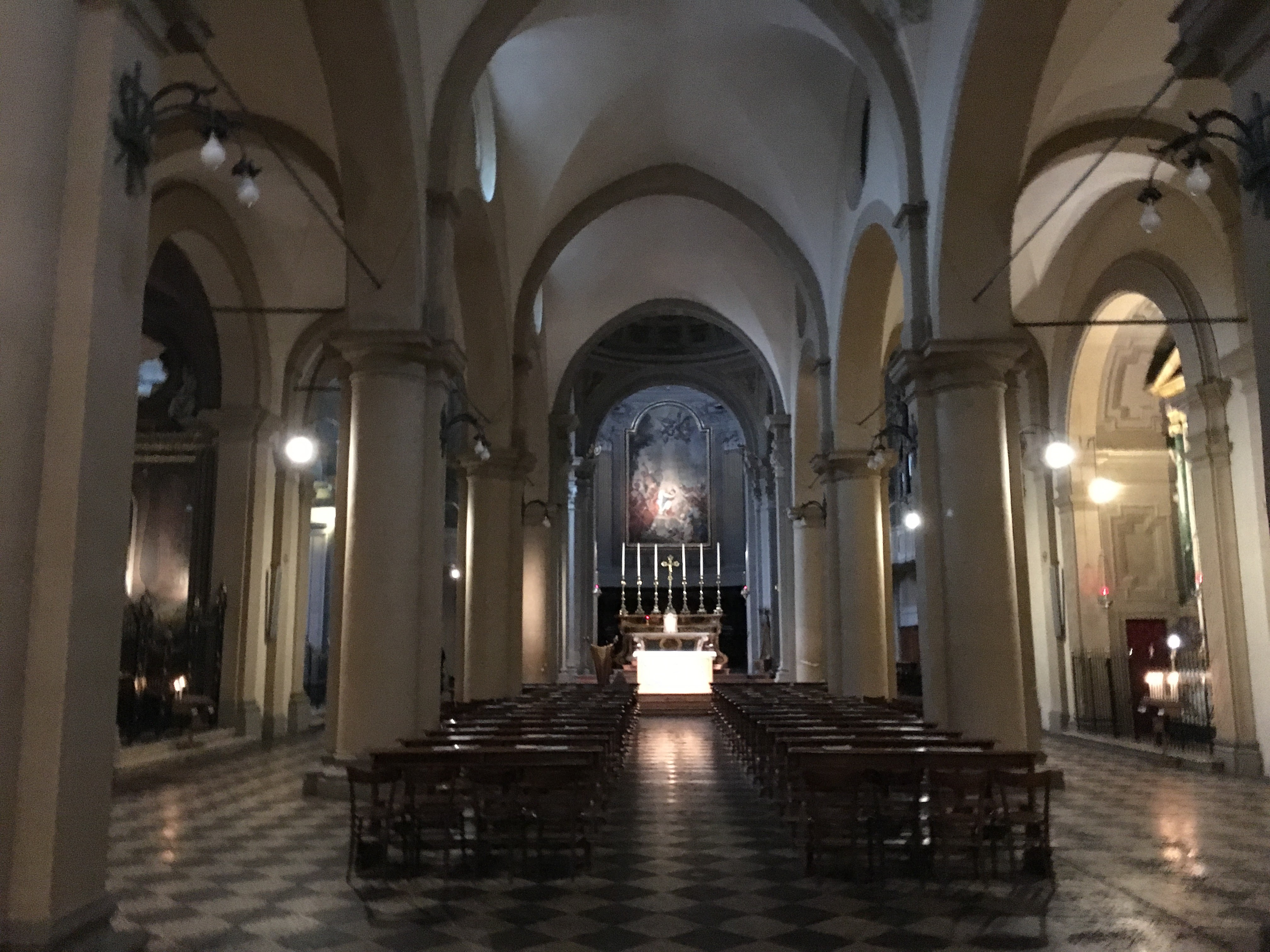

Religion
- Affiliation: Roman Catholic

Location
- Location: Bologna, Italy

Architecture
- Type: Church
- Style: Gothic and Renaissance

San Procolo is an early Gothic-style, Roman Catholic church and former monastery-hospital located on Via Massimo D'Azeglio #52 in central Bologna, region of Emilia Romagna, Italy.

== History ==
The church was erected by Benedictine Monks from the Abbey of Monte Cassino by 1087. It was dedicated to the martyred soldier Proculus of Bologna. The church and adjacent monastery remained under Benedictine rule, until 1796, when Napoleon suppressed the Benedictine order in Bologna.

The Benedictine order, in addition to its contemplative activities, maintained a hostel for pilgrims. In 1297, an adjacent hospital was converted into a hospital, run by nuns of the order of Santa Maria degli Angioli or degl'Innocenti, for the abandoned children. In the early 19th century, the Ospizio degli Esposti was moved from elsewhere in Bologna to this monastery.

== Architecture ==
A major reconstruction of the church started at the end of the 14th century under a Bartolomeo Gillij. A new façade was added in 1400. The Gothic tracery of the ceiling was added from 1383 to 1407.

From 1535 to 1557 the architect Antonio Morandi also called Terribilia participated in reconstruction. In 1744, the architect Carlo Francesco Dotti directed the reconstruction of the interior, which was stopped under the Napoleonic rule. The brick façade was refurbished in the 19th century.

The adjacent monastery has cloister was built in 1577 designed by Domenico Tibaldi. A second cloister was started in 1622 designed by Giulio della Torre, and restored in 1734 by Luigi Casoli. At this time a statue of San Procolo was erected by Angelo Pio in this courtyard.

== Interior ==
To the right of the entrance, the first altar has a depiction of the Crucifixion with Sant'Andrea, Magdalen, and San Giovanni attributed to Giacomo Lippi (Jacopone da Budrio), moved her from the deconsecrated Sant Andrea degli Ansaldi. This altar once held a painting by Giovanni Battista Grati (1651-1758) a pupil of Mattioli, Pasinelli, and Dal Sole, and member of the Accademia Clementina.

The second altar has a Glory of St Benedict by Bartolommeo Cesi. In 1764, the chapel was refurbished with an altarpiece by Pietro Maria Scandellari, and decorated by Raimondi Compagnini, Gaetano Caponeri, and Lorenzo Pranzini with prospective design of Antonio Galli Bibiena.

The third chapel, Capella del Crocifisso, is a relief of Christ attributed to Floriano del Buono.

The fourth chapel has a work depicting the Virgin with Benedictine Saints by Ercole Graziani the Younger.

The main altar (1744-1745) was designed Alfonso Torreggiani with a tabernacle by Giacomo Molinari, with silver-work by Bonaventura Gambari, and statues by Toselli. The choir was designed by Giulio Dalla Torre and Carlo Francesco Dotti, with paintings by Giuseppe Pedretti depicting the Martyrdom of St Proculus. The engraved wooden choir stalls are by Maestro Andrea di Pietro Campana.

The chapels on the left side included a St Cyrus with the Madonna by the school of Carlo Cignani. In the chapel of the Holy Sacrament is a Last Supper by Ginerva Cantofoli. The fresco decoration of the chapel is by Onofrio Zanotti.

The first chapel on the left, holding since the 13th century the relics of both the martyrs Proculus of Bologna and Pozzuoli, was refurbished in 1750 by Alfonso Torreggiani and Antonio Cartolari. Quadratura by Michele Mastellari. The main altarpiece was by Francesco l'Anges (born 1675).

In the Refectory is a canvas depicting The Miracle of the Fishes (1607) by Lionello Spada. It is also noticed that the church includes a canvas by Alessandro Tiarini (1639–40).

Among those buried in the church was Bulgaro the jurist; Bartolomeo Cesi, Alessandro Tiarini, Girolamo Pilotta, and Luigia Maria Rosa Alboni (painters); and Anna Morandi Manzolini (wax modeller); Nicolo Donati (architect); and Carlo Nessi (sculptor).
