= Procilia gens =

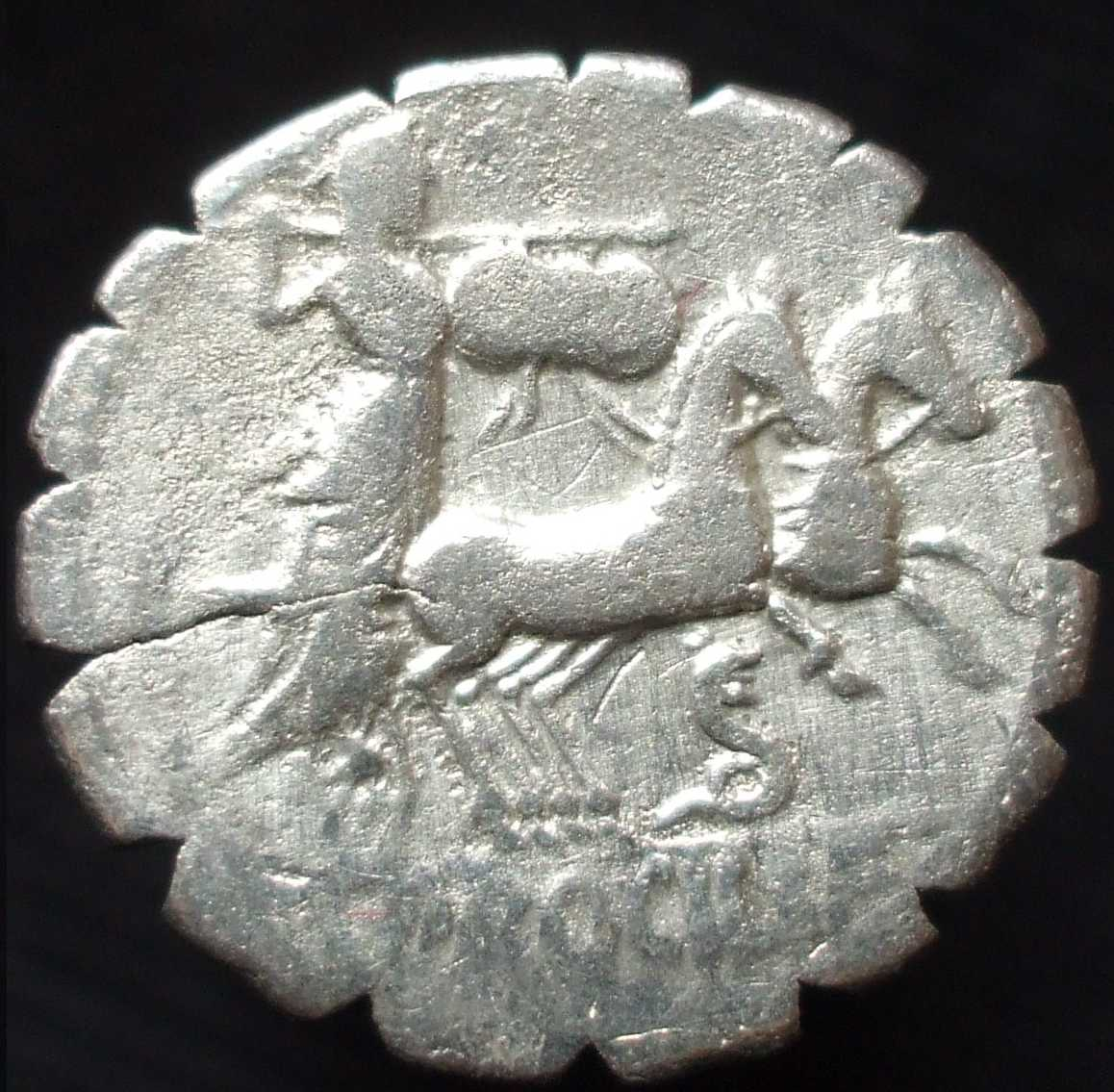
Reverse of a denarius issued by Lucius Procilius in 80 BC, depicting Juno Sospita driving a chariot. The snake alludes to Lanuvium, where a serpent lived in a sacred grove.

The gens Procilia, sometimes written Procillia, was a minor plebeian family at ancient Rome. Members of this gens are first mentioned during the final century of the Republic, but few of them obtained any position of importance in the Roman state, and they are best known as a result of the historian Procillius, a contemporary of Cicero, whose work has been lost, but who was cited as a source by the Roman antiquarians.

== Origin ==
The Procilii may have come from Lanuvium, an ancient city of Latium. A coin issued by the Procilii appears to allude to such an origin, depicting Juno Sospita, whose worship was centered on Lanuvium. The nomen Procilius, sometimes spelled with a double 'l', belongs to a common class of gentilicia derived from names ending in the diminutive suffix '-ulus'. In this case, the name is a patronymic surname derived from the old praenomen Proculus, which Festus reported was originally given to a child born when his father was far from home, although the name has the appearance of a diminutive of some other word or name, such as procus, a suitor, or perhaps more likely procer, a prince. Proca, another possibility, was the name of one of the legendary Kings of Alba Longa, Rome's mother city in story and song, and may be the root form of the name, perhaps with the same meaning as procer. In later times, Proculus was widely used as a surname, and gave rise to the diminutive cognomen Procillus, with which Procilius is easily confused.

== Members ==
This list includes abbreviated praenomina. For an explanation of this practice, see filiation.

- Lucius Procilius L. f., triumvir monetalis in 80 BC. His coins depict Juno Sospita, alluding to his Lanuvian origin.
- Procillius, a historian who lived during the time of Cicero, who wrote on geographical topics. He was cited by Varro and Pliny, and was admired by Atticus, whose opinion was not shared by Cicero.
- Lucius Procilius, tribune of the plebs in 56 BC, he and two of his colleagues caused the elections for the following year to be delayed, and were prosecuted by Publius Clodius Pulcher in 54, although Procilius alone was condemned. He might be the same person as the historian Procillius.

== See also ==
- List of Roman gentes

== Bibliography ==
- Marcus Tullius Cicero, Epistulae ad Atticum, Epistulae ad Quintum Fratrem.
- Marcus Terentius Varro, De Lingua Latina (On the Latin Language).
- Dionysius of Halicarnassus, Romaike Archaiologia (Roman Antiquities).
- Titus Livius (Livy), History of Rome.
- Liber de Praenominibus, a short treatise of uncertain authorship, traditionally appended to Valerius Maximus' Factorum ac Dictorum Memorabilium (Memorable Facts and Sayings).
- Gaius Plinius Secundus (Pliny the Elder), Historia Naturalis (Natural History).
- Claudius Aelianus (Aelian), De Natura Animalium (On the Nature of Animals).
- Paulus Diaconus, Epitome de Sex. Pompeio Festo de Significatu Verborum (Epitome of Festus' De Significatu Verborum).
- Joseph Hilarius Eckhel, Doctrina Numorum Veterum (The Study of Ancient Coins, 1792–1798).
- Wilhelm Drumann, Geschichte Roms in seinem Übergang von der republikanischen zur monarchischen Verfassung, oder: Pompeius, Caesar, Cicero und ihre Zeitgenossen, Königsberg (1834–1844).
- Dictionary of Greek and Roman Biography and Mythology, William Smith, ed., Little, Brown and Company, Boston (1849).
- T. Robert S. Broughton, The Magistrates of the Roman Republic, American Philological Association (1952).
- Michael Crawford, Roman Republican Coinage, Cambridge University Press (1974, 2001).
