= Semachos =

In Greek mythology Semachos was a doublet of Ikarios, the recipient of Dionysus' gift of wine, who welcomed Dionysus to Attica, with a tragic outcome. Semachos was the founder-hero of the Athenian priestesses of Dionysus, the Semachidai.

The name could be given a Hellenic twist by linking it with machia, "battle", but M.C. Astour recommended a derivation from a Northwest Semitic word, represented by the Hebrew šimah, "made to rejoice".

Dionysus was welcomed by the women of Semachos' oikos. His daughter received the gift of a deer skin (nebris), which Karl Kerenyi identified as the bestowal of the rite of maenads in rending limb from limb the animals they sacrificed to Dionysus: "nebrizein also means the rending of an animal."

The date of the introduction of wine making to Greece, which certainly occurred during the Bronze Age, was given the confident precision of 1497 BCE by Jerome in his adaptation of Eusebius' Chronicon.

An inscription records the site of the heroon of Semachos, which lay along the pathway that led to Laurion.
