= Proculus of Bologna =

Italian saint and martyr

Saint Proculus of Bologna
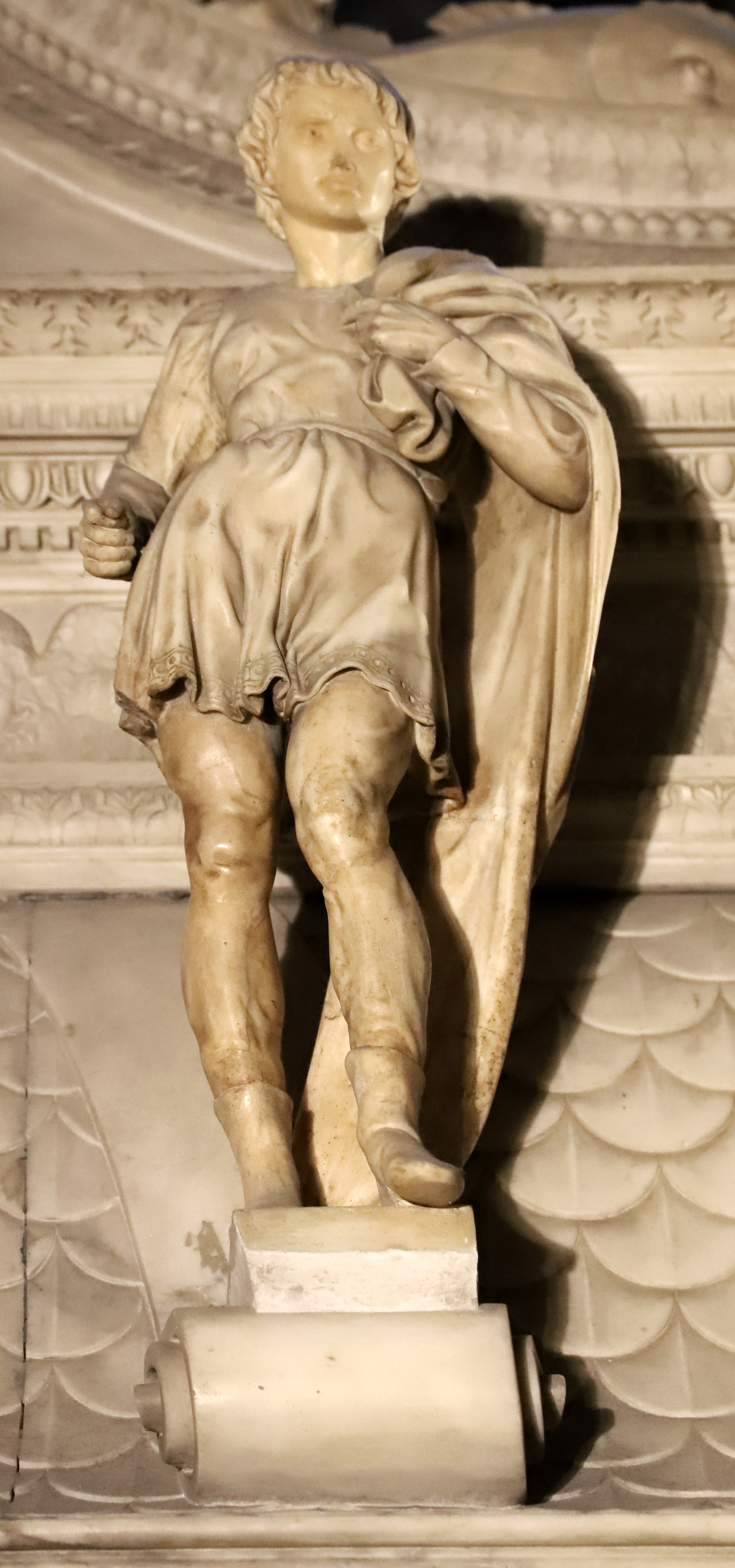
- The Basilica of San Domenico, in Bologna, contains a statue of Saint Proculus by Michelangelo.
- Died: 304 AD
- Venerated in: Roman Catholic Church

Saint Proculus of Bologna or Saint Proculus the Soldier (died c. 304 AD) is an Italian saint. He is said to have been a Roman officer who was martyred at Bologna under Diocletian.

== Traditional Narrative ==
Saint Proculus is a patron of Bologna. There are two distinct legends.

Proculus (sometimes called Proculus Soldato) was a soldier, active in spreading Christianity. In the time of the Diocletian, one Marinus was sent to Bologna to enforce the emperor's edict. Enraged at his cruelties, Proculus went to his house and killed Marinus with an axe. He was himself subsequently beheaded, and the martyr carried his head to the location where a church would later be dedicated to him.

The second account concerns a bishop of Terni, who, attempting to flee persecution from the Goths, came to Bologna where he was subsequently decapitated.

The Bolognese have held Proculus in veneration from very ancient times. His remains are preserved in the church of San Procolo in Bologna.

He is depicted in a statue on the spire of the south transept of the Duomo di Milan.

== See also ==
- Saints Vitalis and Agricola
