= Thiasus =

Ecstatic retinue of the Greek deity Dionysus

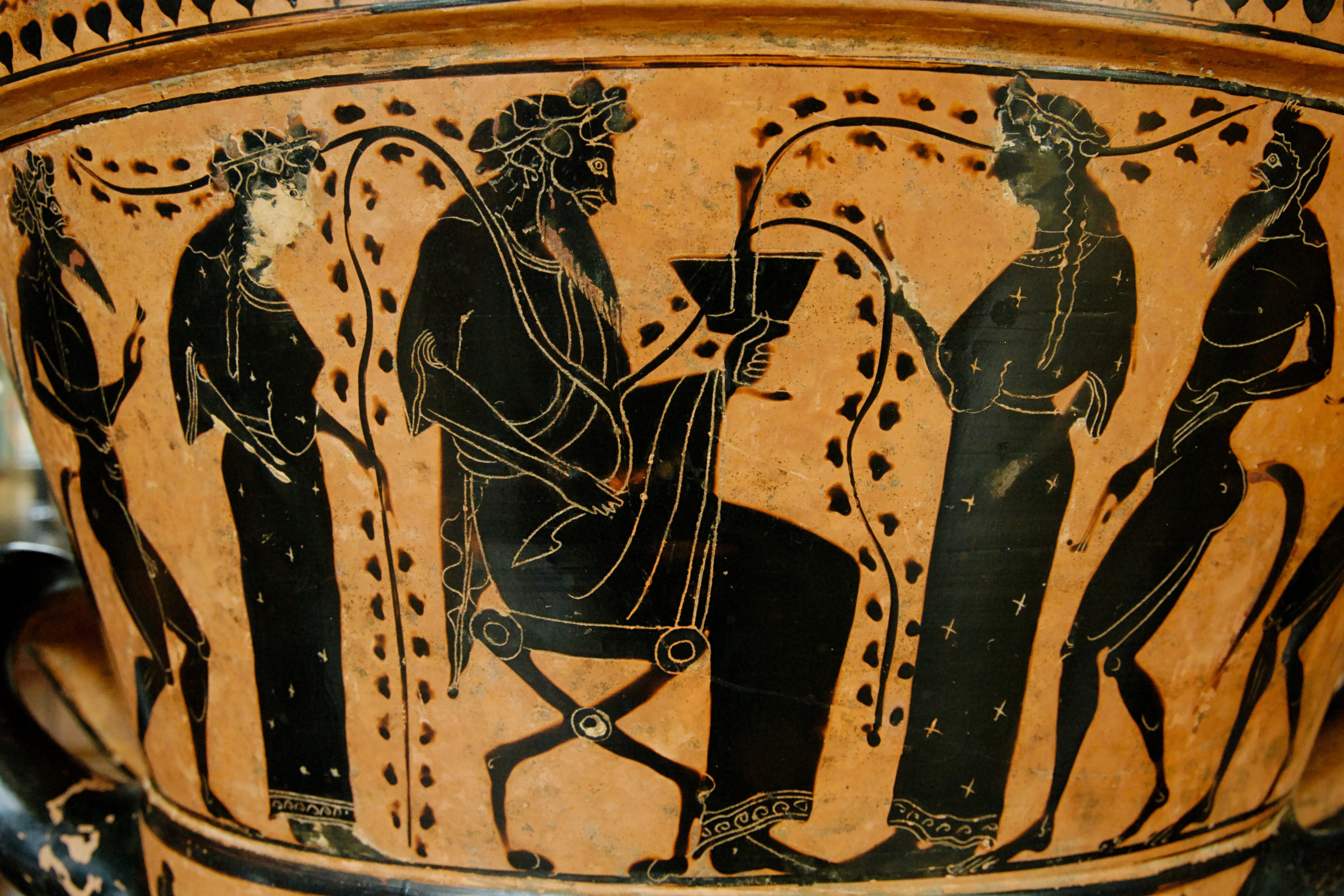
Dionysus and members of his thiasos on an Attic black-figure krater-psykter (525–500 BCE, Louvre Museum)

In Greek mythology and religion, the thiasus (Note: /ˈθʌɪəsəs/, /-sɒs/; Greek: θίασος, romanized: thíasos) was the ecstatic retinue of Dionysus, often pictured as inebriated revelers. Many of the myths of Dionysus are connected with his arrival in the form of a procession. The grandest such version was his triumphant return from "India", which influenced symbolic conceptions of the Roman triumph and was narrated in rapturous detail in Nonnus's Dionysiaca. In this procession, Dionysus rides a chariot, often drawn by big cats such as tigers, leopards, or lions, or alternatively elephants or centaurs.

The thiasos of the sea god Poseidon is depicted as a triumphal wedding procession with Amphitrite, attended by figures such as sea nymphs and hippocamps. In historical Greek society, thiasoi (pl.: Greek: θίασοι) were religious organizations whose existence was protected by law.

== Dionysian thiasos ==
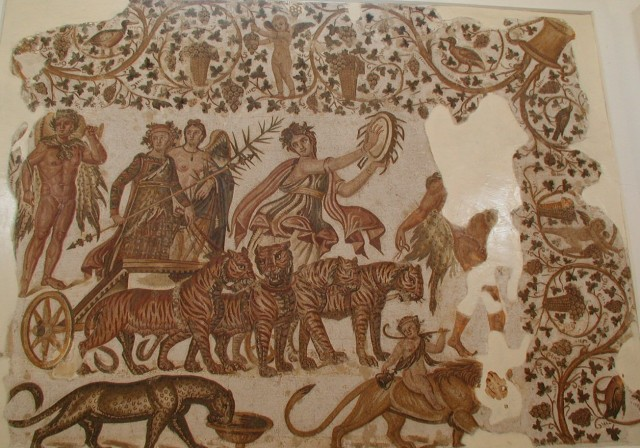
Triumph of Dionysus on a fragmentary Roman mosaic (3rd century CE, Sousse Archaeological Museum)

The most significant members of the thiasus were the human female devotees, the maenads, who gradually replaced immortal nymphs. In Greek vase-paintings or bas-reliefs, lone female figures can be recognized as belonging to the thiasus by their brandishing the thyrsos, the distinctive staff or rod of the devotee.

Other regulars of the retinue were various nature spirits, including the sileni (or human dancers costumed as such), phalluses much in evidence, satyrs, and Pan. The ithyphallic sileni are often shown dancing on vase paintings. The tutor of Dionysus is represented by a single aged Silenus. The retinue is sometimes shown being brought before a seated recipient: the tragic human welcomer of the gift of wine, Ikarios or Semachos, and his daughter, Erigone. In the triumphal form of procession, Ariadne sometimes rides with Dionysus as his consort. Heracles followed the thiasus for a short while following his loss of a drinking contest to Dionysus.

On the 6th-century BC François Vase, Dionysus is accompanied in procession by the three Horae. Other notable depictions in art include the silver "Great Dish" from the Mildenhall Treasure, the Lycurgus Cup, and in the Renaissance Titian's Bacchus and Ariadne. The Dionysian retinue was a popular subject for Roman art, especially bas-reliefs and sarcophagus panels.

== Marine thiasos ==
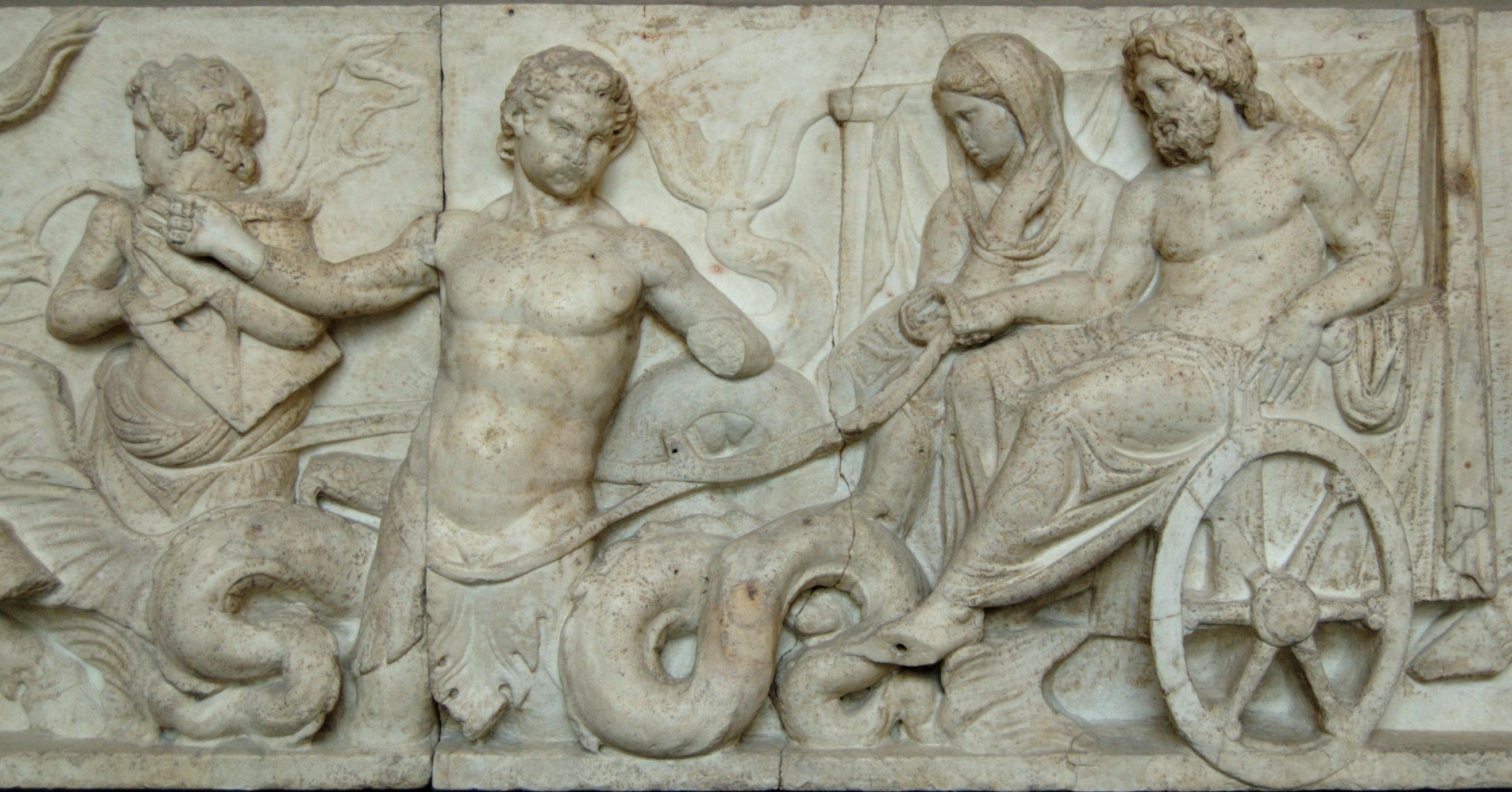
Sea thiasos depicting the wedding of Poseidon and Amphitrite, from the Altar of Domitius Ahenobarbus in the Field of Mars, bas-relief, Roman Republic, 2nd century BCE

A marine thiasos (or sea thiasos) is a term for a group like the Dionysian thiasos, except with the chief god replaced by Poseidon or some other sea deity. Lattimore while insisting that the chief god must be Poseidon in a strict sense, includes examples where Poseidon is completely absent in the composition, which most frequently figure Tritons and Nereids as marine retinues.

An original work of Scopas on this theme was taken to Rome and described by Pliny, but is now lost. Still, the theme is well represented in surviving works of Roman art, from tiny decorative reliefs and large sarcophagus panels to extensive mosaics.

Even in the Skopas example, the main theme was the deliverance of the slain Achilles to Elysium, attended by his mother Thetis (though Poseidon is present as well), and examples of Thetis's retinue have been described as marine thiasos.

The marine thiasos could otherwise be the retinue for Oceanus, or to Venus Marina.
