= Proculeia gens =

Minor plebeian family in ancient Rome

The gens Proculeia was a minor plebeian family at ancient Rome. Members of this gens are first mentioned at the end of the Republic. Gaius Proculeius was one of the most trusted friends and advisers of Octavian, and one of those whom he considered a possible heir. None of the Proculeii ever obtained the consulship, but a number are known from inscriptions.

== Origin ==
The nomen Proculeius, belongs to a common class of gentilicia ending in the diminutive suffix '-eius', often although not exclusively formed from other names ending in '-a' or '-as'. In this case, the name is a patronymic surname derived from the old praenomen Proculus, which Festus reported was originally given to a child born when his father was far from home, although the name has the appearance of a diminutive of some other word or name, such as procus, a suitor, or perhaps more likely procer, a prince. Proca, sometimes given as Procas, another possibility, was the name of one of the legendary Kings of Alba Longa, Rome's mother city in story and song, and may be the root form of the name, perhaps with the same meaning as procer. In later times, Proculus was widely used as a surname, with which Proculeius is easily confused.

== Praenomina ==
The chief praenomina associated with the Proculeii are Gaius, Lucius, Publius, and Quintus. Other names are occasionally found, including Marcus, Sextus, and Aulus. All of these were common names throughout Roman history.

== Members ==
This list includes abbreviated praenomina. For an explanation of this practice, see filiation.

- Gaius Proculeius L. f., struck a coin bearing the head of an uncertain figure, and on the reverse a bipennis, or double-headed axe.
- Gaius Proculeius, an intimate friend of Octavian, who sent him as an emissary to Marcus Antonius and Cleopatra after his victory at Actium. He was the half-brother of Aulus Terentius Varro Murena, and brother-in-law of Gaius Maecenas, another of Octavian's closest friends.
- Proculeius, better known as Proclus of Laodicea, was hierophant at Laodicea in Syria, and the author of several books on philosophy and mathematics.
- Proculeia, wife of Danfeianus, and mother of two children buried at Lugdunum in Gallia Lugdunensis: Danfiola, aged seventeen years, one month, and twelve days, having been married for one year, two months, and a day, and Vincentius or Danfius, aged three years, eight months, and two days.
- Proculeia, buried at Colonia Claudia Ara Agrippinensium in Germania Inferior.
- Proculeia, wife of Gaius Duronius Martialis, with whom she was buried in Noricum, aged thirty, between AD 131 and 170.
- Proculeia C. l., a freedwoman buried at Rome.
- Proculeia P. f., buried at Amiternum.
- Proculeius, named in an inscription from Rome.
- Proculeius P. f., an aedile who held a festival, recorded at Amiternum in Sabinum.
- Gaius Proculeius, a priest of the Magna Mater at Blera in Etruria.
- Gaius Proculeius, named in an inscription from Flavia Solva in Noricum.
- Lucius Proculeius A. f. Titia gnatus, one of the municipal duumvirs at Perusia in Etruria.
- Gaius Proculeius Albanus, a soldier stationed at Herculaneum in Campania.
- Gaius Proculeius (C. f.) Alexander, a freedman, was the husband of Proculeia Calyx, and father of Gaius Proculeius Magnus. Buried with his wife at Salernum in Campania, in a tomb dedicated by their son.
- Gaius Proculeius C. l. Apollonis, a topiarius, or landscape gardener, at Rome.
- Proculeia Boniata, buried at the present site of Zreče, formerly part of Noricum, aged sixty.
- Proculeia (C. l.) Calyx, a freedwoman, was the wife of Gaius Proculeius Alexander, and mother of Gaius Proculeius Magnus. Buried at Salernum with her husband, in a tomb dedicated by their son.
- Proculeia Capriola, mother of Publius Proculeius Celer, Publius Proculeius Clemens, and Publius Proculeius Celerinus, buried at Amiternum.
- Publius Proculeius Celer, son of Proculeia Capriola, and brother of Publius Proculeius Clemens and Publius Proculeius Celerinus, was a soldier in one of the urban cohorts, in the century of Serenus, serving for seventeen years. He was buried at Amiternum.
- Publius Proculeius Celerinus, son of Proculeia Capriola, and brother of Publius Proculeius Celer and Publius Proculeius Clemens, buried at Amiternum.
- Publius Proculeius Clemens, son of Proculeia Capriola, and brother of Publius Proculeius Celer and Publius Proculeius Celerinus, buried at Amiternum.
- Quintus Proculeius Euphrates, one of the vigiles at Rome in AD 202.
- Proculeia Felicitas, the mother of Herennius Aventius, buried at Rome aged eighteen months, three days.
- Proculeius Fidus, named in a funerary inscription from Perusia.
- Quintus Proculeius Finitus, named in a libationary inscription from Celeia in Noricum.
- Proculeia Firmilla, buried at Rome.
- Proculeius P. f. Galba Crispinus, one of the duumvirs at Amiternum.
- Proculeius Gracilis, buried at Aquae Flaviae in Hispania Citerior, aged fifty-five.
- Gaius Proculeius C. l. Heracleo, a freedman named in an inscription from Rome, dating to the latter part of the first century BC.
- Quintus Proculeius Q. l. Hilarus, a freedman buried at Sora in Latium.
- Proculeia C. f. Honorata, daughter of Gaius Proculeius Honoratus, and wife of Quintus Pescennius Avitus, buried at Thubursicum in Africa Proconsularis, aged fifty-three.
- Marcus Proculeius M. f. Justinus, son of Marcus Proculeius Martialis and Gavia Justina, buried at Bedaium in Noricum.
- Gaius Proculeius C. f. Magnus, son of Gaius Proculeius Alexander and Proculeia Calyx, to whom he dedicated a monument at Salernum.
- Marcus Proculeius Martialis, one of the municipal officials of Bedaium, husband of Gavia Justina, and father of Marcus Proculeius Justinus.
- Publius Proculeius Proculinus, one of the duumvirs appointed to govern the colony of Aquincum in Pannonia Inferior, between AD 197 and 209.
- Gaius Proculeius Ɔ. l. Prophetes, a freedman, and a soldier stationed at Herculaneum.
- Gaius Proculeius Pylades, buried at Puteoli in Campania.
- Sextus Proculeius L. f. Rufus, a veteran of the fifteenth legion, made a sacrifice to Jupiter Optimus Maximus at Scarbantia in Pannonia Superior.
- Gaius Proculeius C. f. Rufus Asturicus, a soldier in the fourth cohort of the praetorian guard, buried at Rome aged twenty-five, having served six years.
- Lucius Proculeius Secundus, a cornicularius serving at Gerasa in Arabia Petraea between AD 151 and 170.
- Proculeia Sextulla, wife of Marcus Basilius Hospitalis, buried at Nattabutes in Africa Proconsularis, aged thirty-five.
- Proculeia Stibas, named in an inscription from Rome, dating to the latter part of the first century BC.
- Proculeia P. l. Thaïs, built a tomb at Amiternum for herself and two others.
- Lucius Proculeius Thamyras, named in an inscription from Rome.
- Proculeia Ɔ. l. Tyche, a freedwoman buried at Rome.
- Proculeia Valentina, the wife of Lucius Septimius Florianus, and mother of Lucius Septimius Florentinus, buried with her husband at Jovia in Pannonia Inferior.
- Proculeia Zosime, built a tomb at Rome for her husband Gaius Carvilius Castor, in the latter part of the first century.

== See also ==
- List of Roman gentes

== Bibliography ==
- Liber de Praenominibus, a short treatise of uncertain authorship, traditionally appended to Valerius Maximus' Factorum ac Dictorum Memorabilium (Memorable Facts and Sayings).
- Quintus Horatius Flaccus (Horace), Carmina (Odes).
- Titus Livius (Livy), History of Rome.
- Dionysius of Halicarnassus, Romaike Archaiologia.
- Gaius Plinius Secundus (Pliny the Elder), Historia Naturalis (Natural History).
- Publius Cornelius Tacitus, Annales.
- Plutarchus, Lives of the Noble Greeks and Romans.
- Lucius Cassius Dio Cocceianus (Cassius Dio), Roman History.
- Paulus Diaconus, Epitome de Sex. Pompeio Festo de Significatu Verborum (Epitome of Festus' De Significatu Verborum).
- Joseph Hilarius Eckhel, Doctrina Numorum Veterum (The Study of Ancient Coins, 1792–1798).
- Dictionary of Greek and Roman Biography and Mythology, William Smith, ed., Little, Brown and Company, Boston (1849).
- Theodor Mommsen et alii, Corpus Inscriptionum Latinarum (The Body of Latin Inscriptions, abbreviated CIL), Berlin-Brandenburgische Akademie der Wissenschaften (1853–present).
- Giovanni Battista de Rossi, Inscriptiones Christianae Urbis Romanae Septimo Saeculo Antiquiores (Christian Inscriptions from Rome of the First Seven Centuries, abbreviated ICUR), Vatican Library, Rome (1857–1861, 1888).
- René Cagnat et alii, L'Année épigraphique (The Year in Epigraphy, abbreviated AE), Presses Universitaires de France (1888–present).
- George Davis Chase, "The Origin of Roman Praenomina", in Harvard Studies in Classical Philology, vol. VIII (1897).
- Stéphane Gsell, Inscriptions Latines de L'Algérie (Latin Inscriptions from Algeria, abbreviated ILAlg), Edouard Champion, Paris (1922–present).
- Anna and Jaroslav Šašel, Inscriptiones Latinae quae in Iugoslavia inter annos MCMXL et MCMLX repertae et editae sunt (Inscriptions from Yugoslavia Found and Published between 1940 and 1960, abbreviated ILJug), Ljubljana (1963–1986).
- Brigitte and Hartmut Galsterer, Die Römischen Steininschriften aus Köln (The Roman Stone Inscriptions of Cologne, abbreviated RSK), Cologne (1975).
