= Lustratio =

Ancient Greek and Roman purification ritual

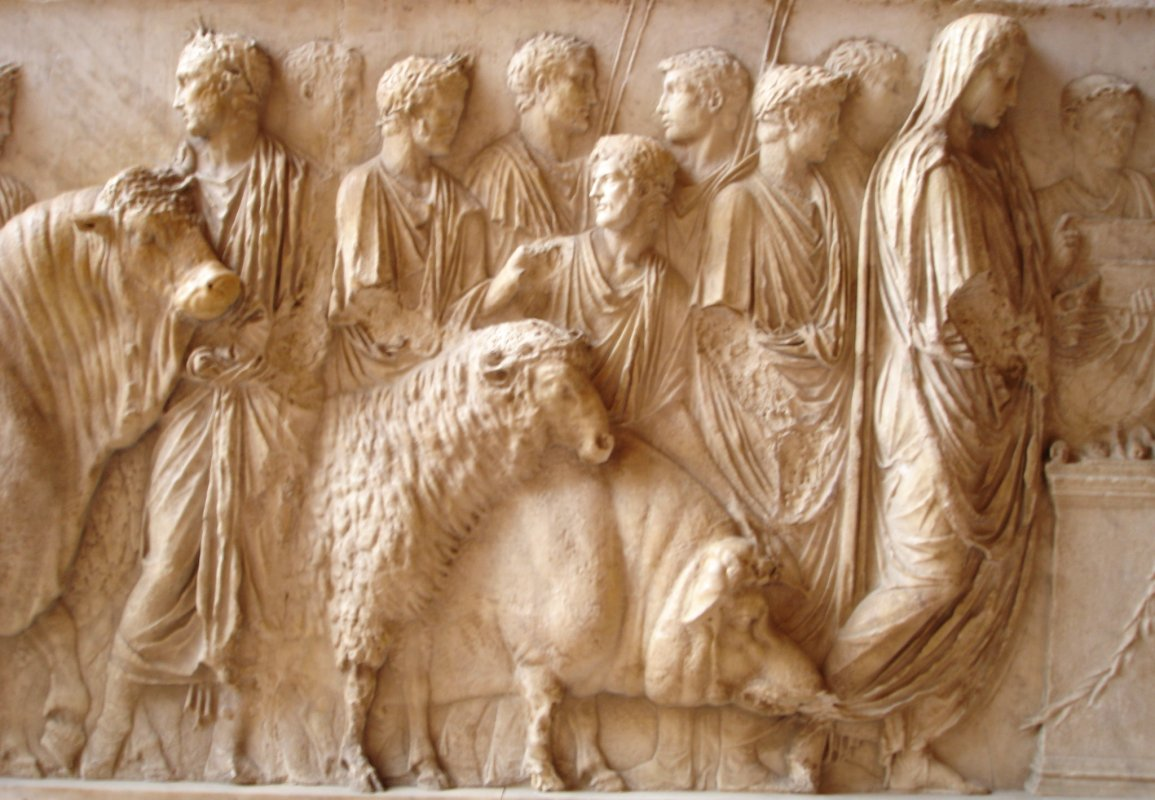
Romans sacrificing a pig, a sheep, and a bull during a suovetaurilia

Lustratio was an ancient Greek and ancient Roman purification ritual. It included a procession and in some circumstances the sacrifice of a pig (sus), a ram (ovis), and a bull (taurus) (suovetaurilia). The name is the source of English "lustration" (a purification).

== Purpose ==
The Lustratio was performed by a priest or magistrate who led a procession with at least one sacrificial animal around the area intended to be purified. Following this, the animals would be sacrificed to the god Mars. The animals which were sacrificed were usually either a pig, ram, or a bull. One reason for a lustratio was to rid newborn children of any harmful spirits that may have been acquired at birth prior to the dies lustricus. The ceremony took place at the age of nine days for baby boys and eight days for baby girls. In the ceremony, the procession traced a magical boundary around the child to be purified. At the end of the ceremony, if the child was male, he was presented with a small charm, usually of gold, called a bulla and kept in a leather bag around the boy's neck. This bulla would be worn until the boy became a man and exchanged the child's purple-lined toga toga praetexta for the plain toga virilis of an adult. The lustratio ceremony culminated with the naming of the child, the name being added to official Roman registers, and the observation of a flight of birds in order to discern the child’s future.

Lustratio ceremonies were also used to purify cities, objects or buildings, and on some occasions to purify an area where a crime had been committed. Lustratio ceremonies were also used to bless crops, farm animals, new colonies, and armies before going into battle or passing into review. In the latter case, troops were often ordered to the coastline, where half of the sacrifice would be thrown into the sea and the other half burnt on an altar. Instructions on the lustratio performed for the Roman town of Iguvium illustrate that the ceremony consisted of a procession of priests and sacrificial victims around the town's citadel, stopping at the three gates to the citadel, where the sacrifices took place. The gates were considered as the weak points which required strengthening.

== Instances ==
One notable occasion was a lustratio held to purify Athens by Epimenides of Crete, after the Cylonian massacre. Another example of this ceremony involved was that of the army of Macedon. It was performed by a dog being cut in half, and the army assembling between the location of the two halves, which were flung in opposite directions. According to Zosimus, the pagan historian of late antiquity, after Constantine the Great had his son Crispus and his own wife Fausta killed, he approached priests of the old religion, and finding that they were unwilling to offer him lustratio for these deeds, went over to the Christian religion after theirs offered him absolution.

== See also ==
- Lustral basin
- Lustration
