= Timeline of Marseille =

The following is a timeline of the history of the city of Marseille, France.

== Prior to 17th century ==
- 600 BCE - Massalia founded by Phocaean Greeks (approximate date).
- 49 BCE - Siege of Massilia.
- 1st C. CE - Roman Catholic diocese of Marseille established.
- ca.290 - Martyrdom of Victor of Marseilles an Egyptian Christian martyr.
- 415 - Abbey of St. Victor founded (approximate date).
- 470 - Town taken by forces of Visigoth Euric.
- 6th C. - Port in operation.
- 839 - Town "sacked by Saracens."
- 1214
  - Town becomes a republic.
  - Notre-Dame de la Garde built.
- 1252 - Town "taken by Charles of Anjou."
- 1262 - Revolt against Angevins.
- 1348 - Bubonic plague outbreak.
- 1365 - Abbey of St. Victor building constructed.
- 1409 - Aix-Marseille University founded.
- 1423 - Sack of Marseille by the forces of Aragón, led by Alfonso V.
- 1453 - Fortifications constructed.
- 1481 - Marseille united with Provence.
- 1486 - Marseille becomes part of France.
- 1524 - Town besieged by forces of Francis I.
- 1531 - Château d'If built.
- 1542 - Église Saint-Ferréol les Augustins (church) dedicated.
- 1593 - Hotel Dieu (hospital) founded.
- 1599 - Marseille Chamber of Commerce founded.

== 17th-18th centuries ==
- 1619 - Église Saint-Cannat (church) dedicated.
- 1640 - Maison du Refuge established.
- 1649 - Plague.
- 1660 - Failed anti-monarchist rebellion and the Siege of Marseille, followed by the Conquest of Marseille, King Louis XIV invades the city.
- 1660 - As part of Louis XIV's conquest, Fort Saint-Jean and Fort Saint-Nicolas are constructed.
- 1672 - Café in business.
- 1673 - Hôtel de Ville built.
- 1685 - The Opéra de Marseille is inaugurated.
- 1702 - Marseille Observatory built.
- 1720-21 - Great Plague of Marseille.
- 1726 - Academy of Science established.
- 1749 - Almshouse built.
- 1770 - City directory published.
- 1778
  - Chateau Borely built.
  - Fossati fountain erected.
- 1781 - Navette de Marseille created.
- 1787 - Grand-Théâtre opens.
- 1789 - April: "Revolutionary commotions" occur.
- 1790
  - Marseille becomes part of the Bouches-du-Rhône souveraineté.
  - Jacobin Club founded.
- 1793 - August: "Marseilles opposes the revolutionary government, and is reduced."
- 1796 - Public library founded.

== 19th century ==
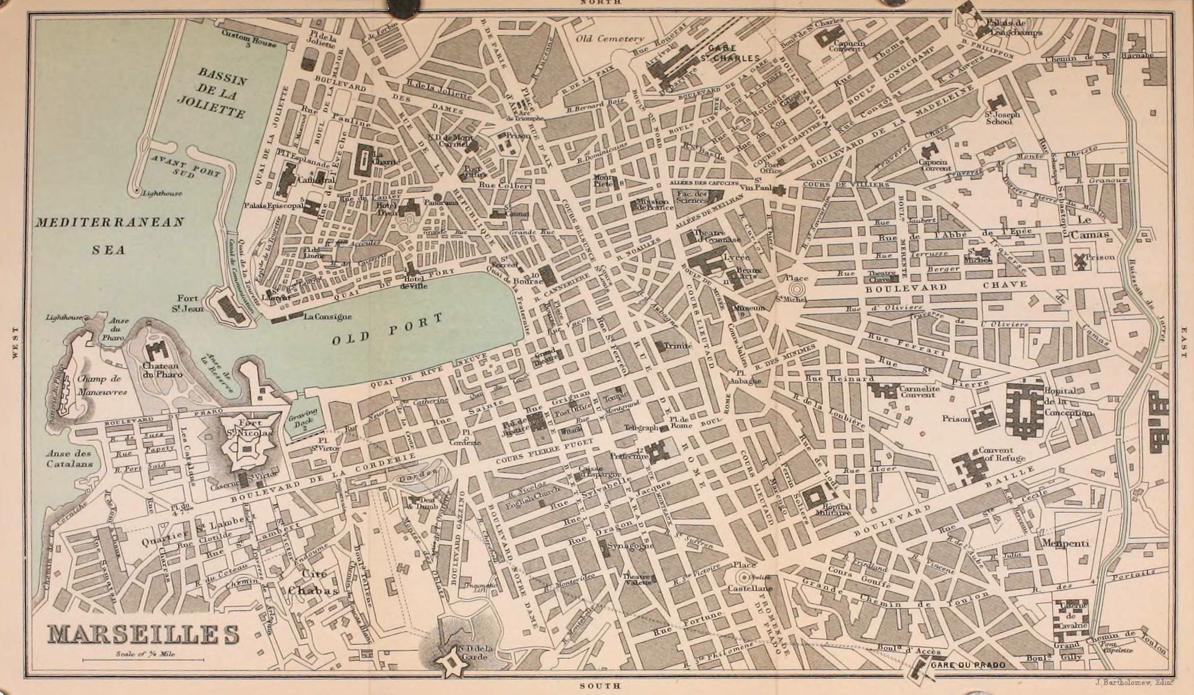
Map of Marseille, 1896

=== 1800s–1840s ===
- 1800 - Population: 96,413.
- 1801
  - Canton of Marseille-1, 2, 3, 4, 5, and 6 created.
  - Musée des beaux-arts de Marseille founded.
- 1802 - Lycée Thiers (school) and Jardin botanique E.M. Heckel (garden) established.
- 1803
  - Santon Fair begins.
  - Cabinet of Natural History founded.
- 1808 - 26 February: Birth of Honoré Daumier.
- 1810 - Société de médecine de Marseille established.
- 1811 - Obelisk erected in the Place Castellane.
- 1819 - Muséum d'histoire naturelle de Marseille founded.
- 1820 - Population: 101,217.
- 1827
  - Le Sémaphore newspaper begins publication.
  - Société de statistique de Marseille established.
- 1836 - Population: 148,597.
- 1837 - Porte d'Aix (arch) inaugurated.
- 1846 - Journal de Marseille newspaper begins publication.
- 1848
  - Paris–Marseille railway begins operating.
  - Gare de Marseille-Saint-Charles opens.
- 1849 - Canal de Marseille opens (97 miles long).

=== 1850s-1890s ===
- 1851
  - Messageries Maritimes shipping company in business.
  - Population: 195,258.
- 1852 - Prison Chave built on Boulevard Chave.
- 1853 - La Joliette dock constructed.
- 1854 - Jardin zoologique de Marseille (zoo) opens.
- 1855 - Phare de Sainte Marie built.
- 1856
  - Population: 233,817.
  - Cimetière Saint-Pierre established.
- 1857 - Alcazar (Marseille) theatre opens.
- 1858
  - Marseille–Ventimiglia railway begins initial operation.
  - Palais du Pharo built.
- 1860
  - Exchange built.
  - Race track in business.
- 1862 - Marseille Courthouse built.
- 1863 - Great Synagogue of Marseille built.
- 1864
  - Rue de la République (Marseille) opens.
  - Notre-Dame de la Garde rebuilt.
- 1865 - Société Marseillaise de Crédit (bank) and Priory of St. Madeleine founded.
- 1866 - Population: 300,131.
- 1868 - Le Petit Marseillais newspaper begins publication.
- 1869 - Palais Longchamp completed.
- 1872 - Business school established.
- 1876
  - Le Petit Provençal newspaper begins publication.
  - Horse-drawn tram begins operating.
- 1877 - Société de géographie de Marseille established.
- 1878 - Saint-Lazare Convent consecrated.
- 1881
  - Italian-French ethnic unrest.
  - Population: 360,099.
- 1883 - Marseille coat of arms design adopted.
- 1884 - Marseille cholera epidemic.
- 1885 - Soleil du Midi newspaper begins publication.
- 1891 - École d'ingénieurs de Marseille (school) founded.
- 1892 - Funicular of the Notre-Dame de la Garde church begins operating.
- 1893
  - Marseille Cathedral consecrated.
  - Institut Colonial de Marseille founded.
- 1894 - Monument des Mobiles erected.^{(fr)}
- 1897 - Excursionnistes Marseillais (hiking club) formed.
- 1899
  - Olympique de Marseille soccer team formed.
  - 2500th anniversary of founding of Marseille.

== 20th century ==
=== 1900s-1940s ===
- 1901
  - "Dock strike."
  - Population: 491,161.
- 1902 - "Strike of sailors."
- 1903
  - July: 1903 Tour de France cycling race passes through Marseille.
  - September: Bubonic plague outbreak.
- 1906
  - Exposition coloniale de Marseille (1906) held.
  - Population: 517,498.
- 1909
  - "Tigeress escapes; terrorises the town."
  - Société linnéenne de Provence founded.
- 1911 - Population: 550,619.
- 1913 - Fountain installed in the Place Castellane.
- 1916 - Musée Cantini founded.
- 1917 - Le Petit Nice restaurant in business.
- 1919 - 13 November: Grand Théâtre burns down.^{(fr)}
- 1922
  - Marseille Provence Airport opens.
  - Colonial exhibition held.
- 1923 - Monument aux héros et victimes de la mer erected.
- 1924 - Opera House built.
- 1926 - Musée Grobet-Labadié opens.
- 1927 - Monument aux morts de l'Armée d'Orient et des terres lointaines erected.
- 1931 - Population: 800,881.
- 1933 - Film Studios Pagnol established.
- 1934 - October 9: King Alexander I of Yugoslavia and Louis Barthou assassinated by Bulgarian terrorist Velicko Kerin.
- 1936 - Population: 914,232.
- 1937 - Stade Vélodrome opens.
- 1938
  - 21 September: Marseille train robbery.
  - 28 October: Marseille fire (1938).
- 1939 - Baumettes Prison built.
- 1940 - Bombing by German and Italian forces.
- 1941 - Combat (French Resistance) active.
- 1942 - November: German occupation begins.
- 1943 - Old Port area evacuated and demolished.
- 1944
  - Bombing by Allied forces.
  - August: Battle of Marseille; German occupation ends.
  - La Marseillaise newspaper in publication.
  - Gaston Defferre becomes mayor.
- 1946
  - Arrondissements of Marseille created.
  - Jean Cristofol becomes mayor.
- Population: 636,264.
- 1947
  - November: Labor unrest.
  - Michel Carlini becomes mayor.

=== 1950s-1990s ===
- 1952 - Cité radieuse housing complex built.
- 1953
  - Gaston Defferre becomes mayor again (remains in office until 1986).
  - La Tourette housing complex built.
- 1955 - Affaire du Combinatie vendetta killings of the criminal Marseille milieu occur.
- 1958 - Marseille twinned with Abidjan, Côte d'Ivoire; Antwerp, Belgium; Copenhagen, Denmark; Genoa, Italy; Haifa, Israel; and Hamburg, Germany.
- 1960s - La Castellane neighborhood built.
- 1961 - Marseille twinned with Kobe, Japan.
- 1962
  - A50 autoroute opens.
  - Or Thora Synagogue established.
  - Population: 778,071.
- 1965 - March: Marseille municipal election, 1965 held.
- 1967 - Marseille Old Port Tunnel opens.
- 1968
  - A7 autoroute opens.
  - Marseille twinned with Dakar, Senegal.
  - Population: 889,029.
- 1970 - University of Provence established.
- 1972
  - A55 autoroute opens.
  - Ballet National de Marseille founded.
  - Marseille twinned with Odesa, Ukraine.
- 1973 - 14 December: Algerian consulate bombed.
- 1975
  - Er Rahmaniyyà group formed.
  - Population: 908,600.
- 1977
  - Marseille Metro Line 1 begins operating.
  - CMA CGM shipping company established.
- 1979 - Marseille-Cassis Classique Internationale footrace begins.
- 1981 - Rodéo (riot).
- 1982
  - PLM Law effected.
  - Marseille becomes part of the Provence-Alpes-Côte d'Azur region.
- 1983
  - SNCF TGV Sud-Est train begins operating.
  - Marseille History Museum opens.
- 1984
  - Marseille Metro Line 2 begins operating.
  - Marseille twinned with Piraeus, Greece.
- 1986
  - March: Provence-Alpes-Côte d'Azur regional election, 1986 held.
  - Robert Vigouroux becomes mayor.
- 1987
  - Jardin de la Magalone becomes property of the city.
  - Marseille twinned with Shanghai, China.
- 1989 - Marseille Festival of Documentary Film begins.
- 1991 - La Commanderie opens.
- 1993 - Tunnel Prado-Carénage opens.
- 1995
  - June: Marseille municipal election, 1995 held.
  - Jean-Claude Gaudin becomes mayor.
  - Centre de Recherche et de Documentation sur l'Océanie founded.
  - Musée de la Faïence de Marseille opens.
- 1997 - La Provence newspaper in publication.
- 1999 - Population: 795,518.

== 21st century ==
=== 2000s ===
- 2001
  - Parc du 26e Centenaire inaugurated.
  - Municipal Archives of Marseille moves to the former Tobacco factory of Marseille.
- 2004 - Marseille twinned with Marrakesh, Morocco.
- 2006
  - École centrale de Marseille created.
  - Marseille twinned with Glasgow, United Kingdom.
- 2007
  - Marseille tramway begins operating.
  - Labor strike.
  - Construction of the International Thermonuclear Experimental Reactor begins in Cadarache, in vicinity of Marseille.
- 2008 - Population: 851,420.
- 2009 - Collège Ibn Khaldoun opens.

=== 2010s ===
- 2010
  - March: Provence-Alpes-Côte d'Azur regional election, 2010 held.
  - Garbage strike occurs.
- 2011
  - Population: 850,636.
- 2012 - Place des Capucines pedestrianized.
- 2013
  - Museum of European and Mediterranean Civilisations opens.
  - City designated a European Capital of Culture.
- 2014 - March: Marseille municipal election, 2014 held.
- 2015
  - 9 February: Shooting occurs in La Castellane.
  - September: Drug ring trial begins.
  - December: 2015 Provence-Alpes-Côte d'Azur regional election held.
  - Marseille tramway Line 3 begins operating.
  - Cantons 1, 2, 3, 4, 5, 6, 7, 8, 9, 10, 11, and 12 created per 2014 France cantonal redistricting.
- 2016 - Metropolis of Aix-Marseille-Provence established.
- 2017 - Stabbing occurs in Saint Charles train station.
- 2018 - Two buildings collapse in the center of Marseille eight people are killed.

== See also ==
- History of Marseille
- Urban planning in Marseille
- List of mayors of Marseille
- List of mayors of Marseille sectors
- List of heritage sites in Marseille
- History of Provence region
- Timeline of Provence region

Other cities in the Provence-Alpes-Côte d'Azur region:

- Timeline of Aix-en-Provence
- Timeline of Arles
- Timeline of Avignon
- Timeline of Nice
- Timeline of Toulon

== Bibliography ==
=== in English ===
Published in the 19th century

- Heinrich August Ottokar Reichard (1816), "Marseille", An Itinerary of France and Belgium, London: Samuel Leigh
- "Marseilles", Cities and Principal Towns of the World, Cabinet Cyclopaedia, London: Longman, Rees, Orme, Brown, & Green, 1830, OCLC 2665202
- "Marseilles", Edinburgh Encyclopaedia, vol. 13, Edinburgh: Blackwood, 1830
- R. T. Claridge (1839), "Marseilles", A Guide down the Danube, London: F. C. Westley
- "Marseilles", Hand-book for Travellers in France (3rd ed.), London: Murray, 1848
- Frederick Martin (1867), "Marseilles", Commercial Handbook of France, London: Longmans, Green, OCLC 4471325
- William Henry Overall, ed. (1870). "Marseilles". Dictionary of Chronology. London: William Tegg. hdl:2027/uc2.ark:/13960/t9m32q949.
- William Smith, ed. (1872) [1854]. "Massilia". Dictionary of Greek and Roman Geography. London: John Murray. hdl:2027/hvd.ah5cur.
- George Henry Townsend; Frederick Martin (1877), "Marseilles", A Manual of Dates (5th ed.), London: Frederick Warne & Co., hdl:2027/hvd.32044088047865
- John Ramsay McCulloch (1880), "Marseilles", in Hugh G. Reid (ed.), A Dictionary, Practical, Theoretical and Historical of Commerce and Commercial Navigation, London: Longmans, Green, and Co.
- C. B. Black (1890), "Marseilles", The Riviera (7th ed.), Edinburgh: Adam & Charles Black

Published in the 20th century

- "Marseilles", Southern France, Karl Baedeker, 1902
- T. G. Bonney (1904), "Marseilles", The Mediterranean, its storied cities and venerable ruins, New York: J. Pott
- "Marseilles", Jewish Encyclopedia, vol. 8, New York, 1904, hdl:2027/mdp.49015002282243
- "Marseilles" . Encyclopædia Britannica. Vol. 17 (11th ed.). 1910. pp. 766–768.
- Benjamin Vincent (1910), "Marseilles", Haydn's Dictionary of Dates (25th ed.), London: Ward, Lock & Co., hdl:2027/loc.ark:/13960/t89g6g776
- Nathaniel Newnham Davis (1911), "Marseilles", The Gourmet's Guide to Europe (3rd ed.), London: Grant Richards
- Daniel C. Haskell, ed. (1922), "Provencal literature and language, including the local history of southern France", Bulletin of the New York Public Library, vol. 26, hdl:2027/mdp.39015035117657, "Local history: Marseilles"
- United States. Army Service Forces. Information and education division (1944), "Marseille", Pocket Guide to the Cities of Southern France, USA: Government Printing Office, OCLC 6205223
- "Marseilles". Michelin Green Guide. Michelin. 1991. ISBN 978-2-06-701375-9. OL 8836622M.
- Gérard Detaille; Jean Arrouye (1998). Marseille, a century of pictures. Marseille: Editions Parenthèses. ISBN 978-2-86364-100-2.
- Daniel Lord Smail (2000). Imaginary Cartographies: Possession and Identity in Late Medieval Marseille. Cornell University Press. ISBN 0-8014-3626-5.

Published in the 21st century

- Sheila Crane (2005), "Mutable Fragments: Destructive Preservation and the Postwar Rebuilding of Marseille", Future Anterior: Journal of Historic Preservation, History, Theory, and Criticism, 2 (1): xiv–11, JSTOR 25834956
- Alain Motte (2005). "Marseilles-Aix". In Anton Kreukels; et al. (eds.). Metropolitan Governance and Spatial Planning: Comparative Case Studies of European City-Regions. Routledge. ISBN 978-1-134-49606-8.
- "Long Integrated, Marseille Is Spared", Washington Post, 16 November 2005
- Junko Thérèse Takeda (2011). Between Crown and Commerce: Marseille and the Early Modern Mediterranean. Johns Hopkins University Press. ISBN 978-1-4214-0112-6.
- "Marseille's Melting Pot". National Geographic Magazine. USA. 2012. Archived from the original on February 19, 2012.
- Tour Diary (PDF), Musée d'Histoire de Marseille, 2013
- Simon Kitson (2014). Police and Politics in Marseille, 1936-1945. Brill. ISBN 978-90-04-26523-3.

=== in French ===
- "Marseille". Almanach général des marchands, négocians, armateurs et fabricans (in French). Paris: L. Cellot. 1779. ISSN 1954-6521.
- Tableau historique et politique de Marseille (in French) (4th ed.). Marseille: Chardon. 1829.
- Augustin-Jules-Esprit Fabre [in French] (1829). Histoire de Marseille (in French). M. Olive; Lacroix.
- Jean-Baptiste-Joseph Champagnac [in French] (1839). "Marseille". Manuel des dates, en forme de dictionnaire. Perisse frères.
- Eusèbe Girault de Saint-Fargeau [in French] (1850). "Marseille". Guide pittoresque: portatif et complet, du voyageur en France (in French) (3rd ed.). Paris: Firmin Didot frères. p. 496. hdl:2027/uiug.30112081968700.
- Amédée Boudin (1852). Histoire de Marseille (in French). A. Martinon.
- Indicateur marseillais (in French). 1853-1980
  - 1891 ed.
- Louis Paris, ed. (1864), "Marseille ... Documents pour servir a l'histoire de la Province", Le Cabinet historique (in French), vol. 10, Paris, pp. 29 v, hdl:2027/mdp.39015069853227
- Catalogue de la Bibliothèque communale de Marseille (in French). Barlatier-Feissat et Demonchy. 1864-1869
- Alfred Saurel [in French] (1877). Dictionnaire des villes, villages & hameaux du département des Bouches-du-Rhône. Marseille: Marius Olive.
- Octave Teissier [in French] (1878). Histoire du commerce de Marseille pendant vingt ans (1855-1874) (in French). Librairie Guillaumin.
- Hippolyte Mireur (1882). La prostitution à Marseille; histoire, administration et police, hygiène (in French). Dentu.
- Prosper Castanier (1896). Les origines historiques de Marseille et de la Provence. Vol. 2. Marpon & Flammarion.
- "Marseille". La Provence. À la France: sites et monuments (in French). Paris: Touring-Club de France. 1902. OCLC 457600236.
- Émile Camau (1905). Marseille au XXme siècle (in French). P. Ruat; [etc., etc.]
- "Marseille". Provence. Guides Joanne (in French). 1906. hdl:2027/uc1.$b192331.
- Paul Masson (1906). Marseille et la colonisation française: essai d'histoire coloniale (in French). Barlatier.
- "Marseille". Dictionnaire Bouillet (in French) (34th ed.). Hachette. 1914. hdl:2027/mdp.39015074817142.
- Raoul Busquet. Histoire de Marseille. Paris, Robert Laffont, 1978
- Édouard Baratier. Histoire de Marseille. Toulouse, 1990
- Emile Temime (ed.). Histoire des migrations à Marseille (in French). 1990–1991. 4 vols.
- "L'extension de Marseille depuis 1945" (in French). Marseille History Museum. 2013. (map)
