= Heckeldora =

Scientific classification
- Kingdom: Plantae
- Clade: Tracheophytes
- Clade: Angiosperms
- Clade: Eudicots
- Clade: Rosids
- Order: Sapindales
- Family: Meliaceae
- Genus: Heckeldora; Pierre

Genus of plants

Heckeldora is a genus of flowering plants belonging to the family Meliaceae. They are shrubs or small trees with odd-pinnate leaves. Plants are dioecious, with male and female flowers on separate plants.

Its native range is western and western central Tropical Africa. It is found in the countries of Cameroon, Congo, Equatorial Guinea, Gabon, Gulf of Guinea Islands, Ivory Coast, Liberia, Nigeria, Sierra Leone and Zaire.

The genus name of Heckeldora is in honour of Édouard Marie Heckel (1843–1916), a French botanist and medical doctor, and director of the Jardin botanique E.M. Heckel in Marseille. It was first described and published in the Bull. Mens. Soc. Linn. Paris Vol.2 on page 1268 in 1896.

== Known species ==
According to Kew:

- Heckeldora jongkindii J.J.de Wilde
- Heckeldora ledermannii (Harms) J.J.de Wilde
- Heckeldora leonensis (Hutch. & Dalziel) E.J.M.Koenen
- Heckeldora leptotricha (Harms) J.J.de Wilde
- Heckeldora staudtii (Harms) Staner
- Heckeldora trifoliolata J.J.de Wilde
- Heckeldora zenkeri (Harms) Staner
