= Reichard =

Reichard is a surname of German origin. Notable people with the surname include:

- Chad Reichard, American politician
- Christian Gottlieb Reichard (1758–1837), German cartographer
- Cody Reichard (born 1987), American ice hockey player
- Gladys Reichard (1893–1955), American anthropologist and linguist
- Harry Hess Reichard (1878–1956), American German writer and scholar
- Heinrich August Ottokar Reichard (1751–1828), German author and theatre director
- Joseph Martin Reichard (1803–1872), German politician and revolutionary
- Maja Reichard (born 1991), Swedish swimmer
- Paul Reichard (1854–1938), German explorer
- Wilhelmine Reichard (1788–1848), German balloonist
- Will Reichard (born 2001), American football player
