= Velten (disambiguation) =

Velten is a town in Brandenberg, Germany. People with the surname Velten include,

- Geoffroy Velten, (1831–1915), French brewer, newspaper proprietor and senator
- Julie Favre (née Velten), (1833–1896), French philosopher and educator
- Harry V. Velten (1897-1967), American linguist and professor at Indiana University
- Tim Velten (born 1983), American soccer player
- Yury Velten or Georg Friedrich Veldten (1730–1801), court architect to Catherine the Great, Empress of Russia
