= Édouard Marie Heckel =

French botanist and medical doctor

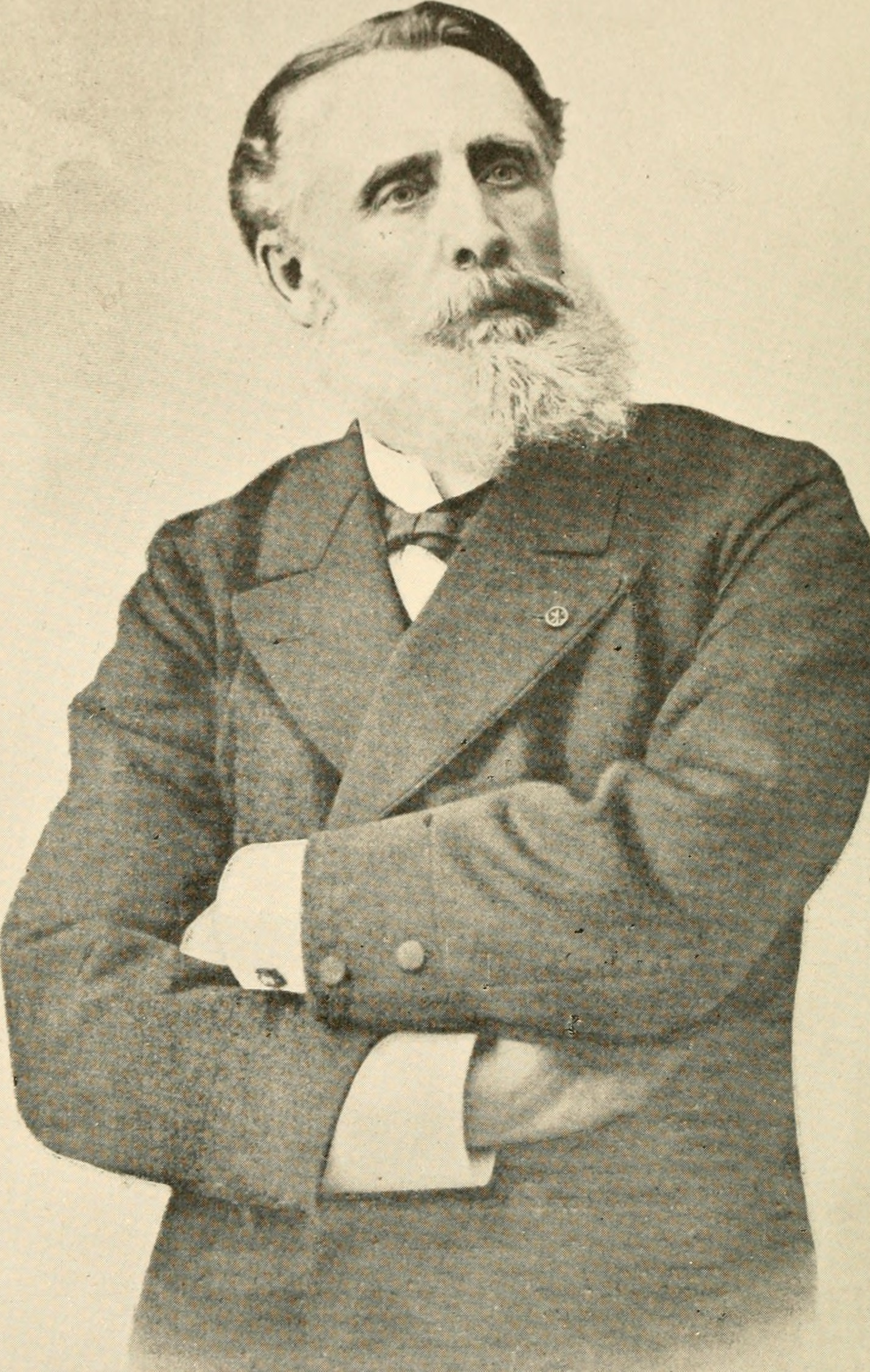
Édouard Marie Heckel

Dr. Édouard Marie Heckel (24 March 1843 – 20 January 1916) was a French botanist and medical doctor, and director of the Jardin botanique E.M. Heckel in Marseille.

Heckel was born in Toulon, studied pharmacy and medicine, and in 1861 visited the Caribbean and Australia. In 1875, he was appointed professor in the faculty of sciences at Marseille, and in 1877 professor of medicine. He became a professor of natural history in Nancy in 1878, and is known for his studies of tropical plants and their use as medicinal plants and oilseeds.

From 1885, Heckel turned to the study of tropical plants such as medicinal or industrial oilseeds. In 1893 he founded the Colonial Institute and Museum of Marseille and creates a tropical pathology professorship at the medical school.

In 1887, he won the Prix Barbier from the French Academy of Sciences.

In 1896, French botanist Jean Baptiste Louis Pierre named a genus of flowering plants (belonging to the family Meliaceae) from western central Tropical Africa, Heckeldora in his honour.

In 1901, he launched the idea of creating an exhibition devoted exclusively to French colonies. This project would be supported by Jules Charles-Roux, who would become the Commissioner General while Heckel was his deputy. The exhibition was held at Parc Chanot in Marseille and was a great success from its opening on 14 April 1906 to its closure on 18 November 1906.
