= Chamber of Commerce and Industry Aix Marseille Provence =

Oldest chamber of commerce in the world, founded 1599

- Chambre de commerce et d'industrie Aix Marseille-Provence
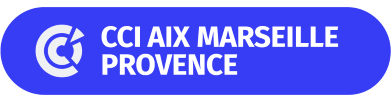
- Current logo

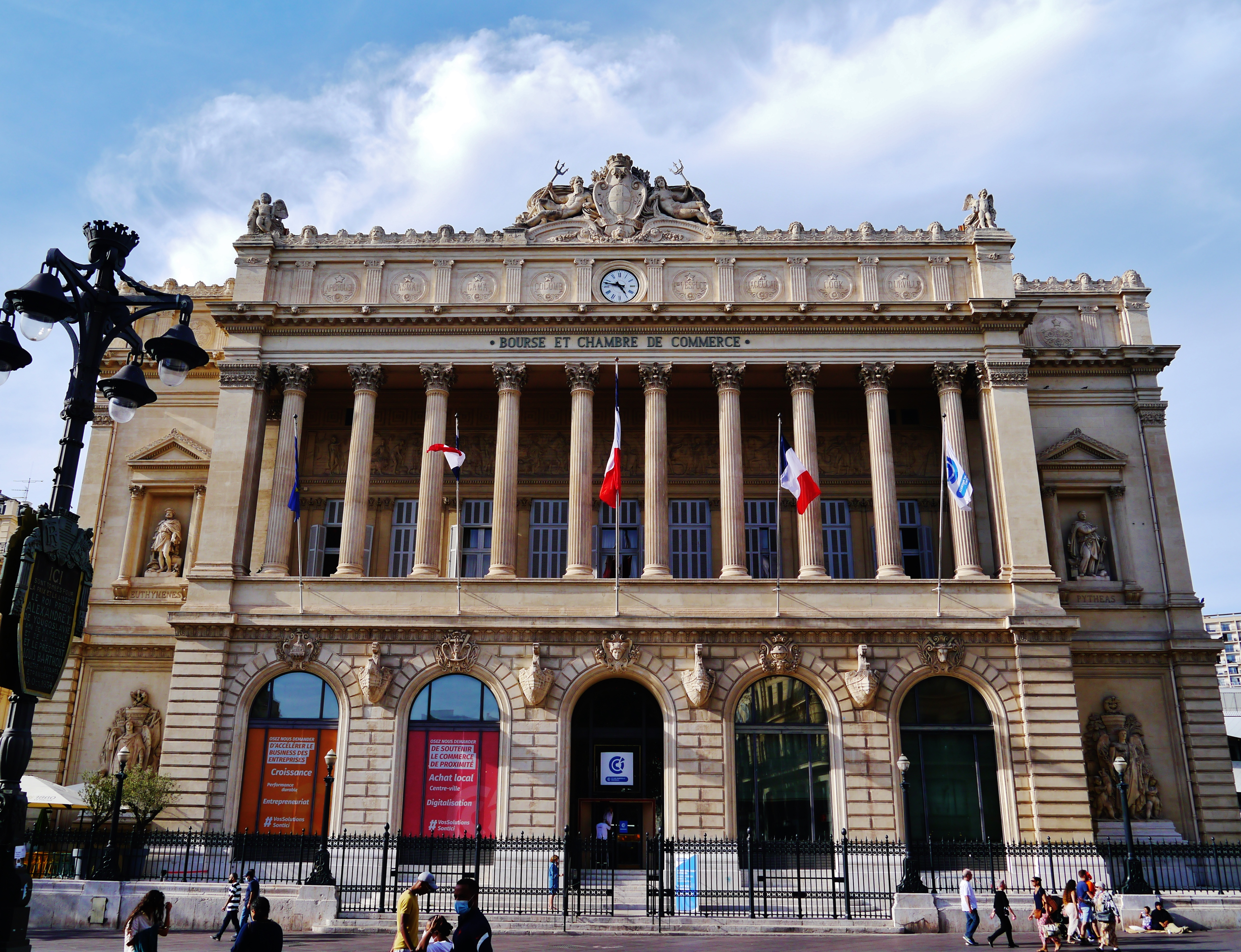
- The Marseille Stock Exchange Building, current headquarters of the CCIAMP, was inaugurated in 1860
- Abbreviation: CCIAMP
- Formation: Created: August 5th, 1599; Reorganized: April 15, 1600; Abolished: 1648; Re-established: 1660; Abolished: 1791; Re-established: 1802; Absorbed by the state: April 9, 1898; Expanded: 1960–1990; Expanded: 2020
- Founded at: Marseille
- Headquarters: Palais de la Bourse, 9 La Canebière, 13001 Marseille, France
- Location: France
- Coordinates: 43.296165955351796°N 5.375508461179118°E
- President: Jean-Luc Chauvin
- Website: https://www.cciamp.com
- Formerly called: Marseille Chamber of Commerce

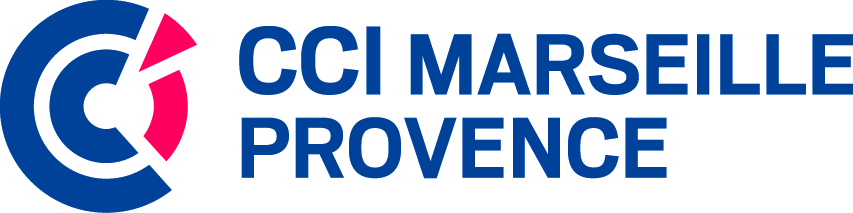
Logo of the CCIMP, prior to its expansion in 2020

The Chamber of Commerce and Industry Aix Marseille Provence (CCIAMP), originally known as the Marseille Chamber of Commerce, later as the Chamber of Commerce and Industry Marseille Provence (CCIMP), is the oldest Chamber of Commerce in the world, established in 1599. The Marseille Chamber also invented the phrase "Chamber of Commerce." According to the Chamber, it was originally created to protect French merchant vessels from Piracy in the Mediterranean. However, the City Council briefly abolished the Chamber in the mid-1600's, during The Fronde, in a failed uprising of the nobility against the King. In 1660, after Louis XIV laid siege to the city and invaded it, occupying the city for 5 days, he re-certified the Chamber. During the French Revolution, the Chamber – along with every other Chamber in France – was again abolished, but was reestablished in 1802. Today, it is a participant of the Council of Europe initiative Routes of the Olive Tree.

Originally, the institution was housed in the Palais Communal. Later it moved to the Hôtel de Ville. At the beginning of the 20th century, it was headquartered in a temporary building at the Place Général de Gaulle. In 1852, the architect Pascal Coste was selected to build the Palais de Bourse et Commerce, inaugurated on September 10, 1860 by Napoleon III and Eugénie de Montijo. The building, also known as the Marseille Stock Exchange Building, has been the headquarters of the CCIAMP ever since.

== Presidents of the Chamber ==
Before 1832, Chamber presidents were rotated on a weekly basis, and therefore, while their names are recorded in the Chamber's archives (one of the largest business history archives in the world), they are not presently kept on public display. Presidents following 1832 are displayed with portraits lining the central staircase of the Marseille Stock Exchange Building.

- 1832-1837: Alexis-Joseph Rostand
- 1837-1838: Auguste Lafon
- 1838-1842: Wulfran Puget
- 1842-1843: Élysée Reynard
- 1843-1845: Bruno Rostand
- 1844-1845: Alexander Warrain
- 1845-1847: Lazare Luce
- 1847-1849: David Rabaud
- 1849-1852: Fabricius Paranque
- 1852-1866: Jean-Baptiste Pastré
- 1866-1872: Amédée Armand
- 1872-1875: Jules Gimmig
- 1875-1881: Alphonse Grandval
- 1881-1891: Cyprien Fabre
- 1891-1901: Augustin Féraud
- 1901-1905: Léopold Le Mée de La Salle
- 1905-1909: Paul Desbief
- 1909-1911: Lucien Estrine
- 1911-1913: Albert Armand
- 1913-1919: Adrien Artaud
- 1920-1923: Hubert Giraud
- 1924-1927: Emile Rastoin
- 1928-1929: Edgar David
- 1930-1931: George Brenier
- 1932-1933: Maurice Hubert
- 1934-1937: Felix Prax
- 1937-1941: Antoine Boude
- 1941-1944: Émile Régis
- 1944-1947: Charles Mourre
- 1948-1949: André Cordesse
- 1950-1951: Édouard Rastoin
- 1952-1953: Marcel Rogliano
- 1954-1955: Francis Dufour
- 1956-1959: Pierre Keller
- 1960-1963: Léon Bétous
- 1963-1967: Émile Blachette
- 1967-1970: Maurice Chabas
- 1971-1974: Pierre Blum
- 1974-1977: Jacques Deguignes
- 1977-1979: André Touret
- 1980-1982: Paul Fabre
- 1983-1987: Henri Mercier
- 1987-1988: Albert Bourdillon
- 1988-1991: François Le Bars
- 1992-1997: Henry Roux-Alezais
- 1998-2003: Claude Cardella
- 2004-2016: Jacques Pfister
- Since 2016: Jean-Luc Chauvin
