= Institut Colonial de Marseille =

French colonial institute

The institut colonial de Marseille is the first colonial institute established in France. It was founded in 1893 under the leadership of Dr. Édouard Heckel (1843–1916).

The Colonial Institute of Marseilles is initially funded by the French Ministry of Colonies and the Marseille Chamber of Commerce, it collected and provided statistics on oversea territories (then colonies), created six professorship on "Colonial education" and funded missions for the benefit of its colonial Museum. The collections were used repeatedly for colonial exhibitions. They consist of imported goods from the colonies, from Madagascar, Indo-China and Guyana, among others, and are essentially of botanic nature. The collection are still on display at the University of Provence, they are presented in connection with their uses, which sometimes are several millennia old.
