= Great Synagogue of Marseille =

Synagogue in Marseille, France

- French: Grande synagogue de Marseille
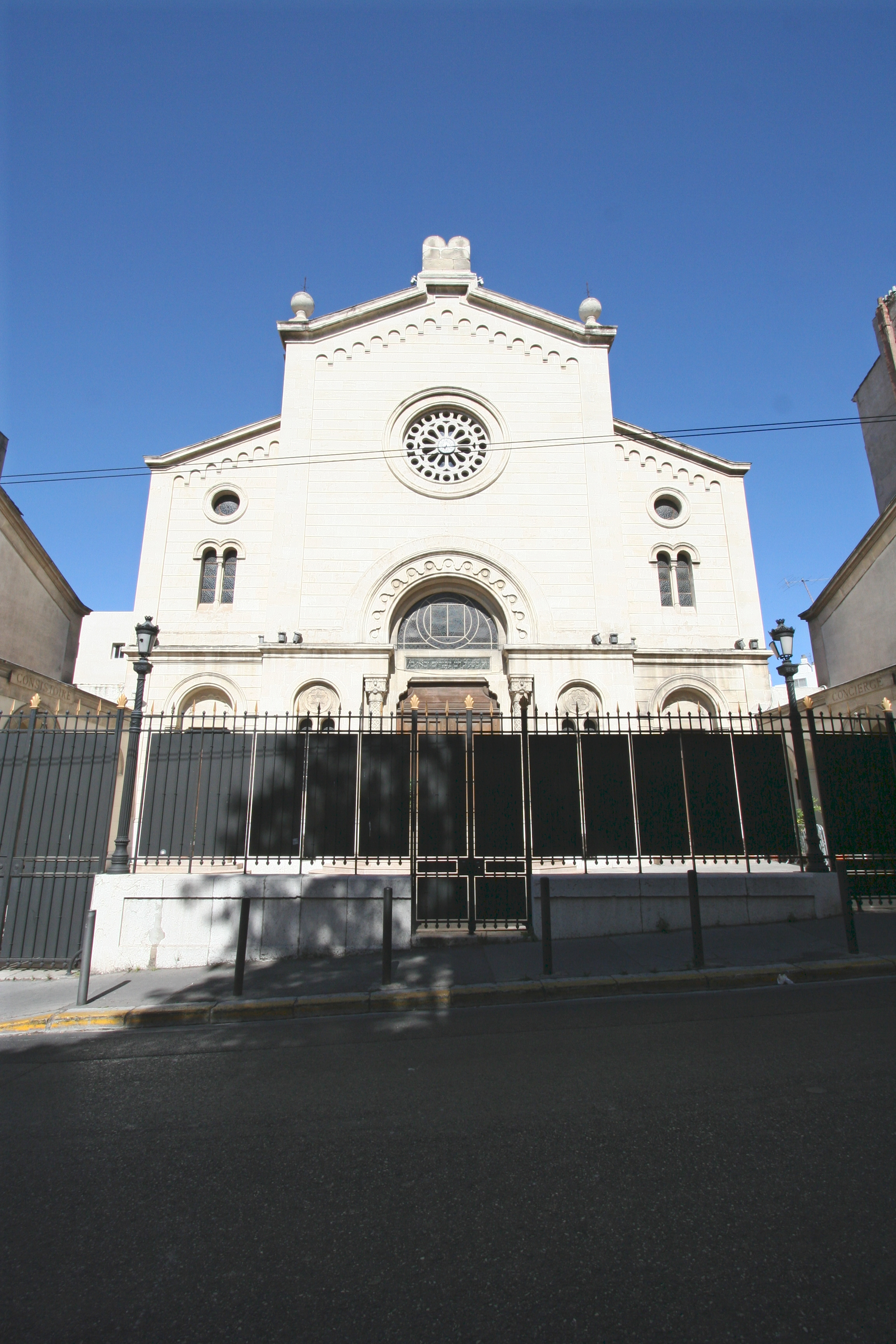
- The synagogue in 2011

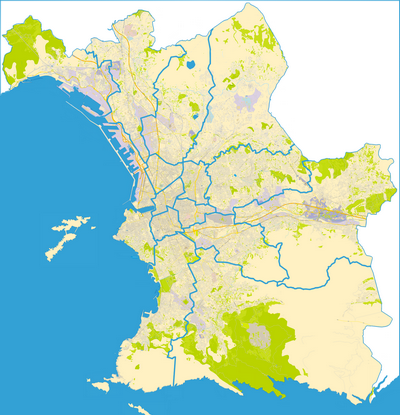
- Location of the synagogue in Marseille, France

Religion
- Affiliation: Judaism
- Rite: Nusach Sefard
- Ecclesiastical or organisational status: Synagogue
- Status: Active

Location
- Location: Rue Breteuil, VI^{e} arrondissement, Marseille
- Country: France
- Coordinates: 43°17′13″N 5°22′39″E

Architecture
- Architect: Nathan Salomon
- Type: Synagogue architecture
- Style: Romanesque Revival; Byzantine Revival
- Completed: 1864
- Materials: Stone

Monument historique
- Official name: Synagogue dite aussi le grand temple ou la grande synagogue (in French)
- Type: Base Mérimée
- Designated: 1 August 2007
- Reference no.: PA13000053

The Great Synagogue of Marseille (French: Grande synagogue de Marseille) is a Jewish congregation and synagogue located on Rue Breteuil in the 6th arrondissement of Marseille, France. The building was listed as a monument historique in 2007. The congregation worships in the Sephardi rite.

== History ==
When the previous synagogue on the Rue Grignan was in disrepair and too small, a campaign began in 1855 to raise money for a new site. The design by the architect Nathan Salomon was approved in 1860 and the building finished in 1864.

The synagogue takes the basilica form more commonly associated with ancient Greece and Rome, and churches. It is built in the Romanesque Revival and Byzantine Revival styles, and takes influence from the Synagogue de Nazareth, completed in Paris in 1852. A pulpit and an organ – both also associated more with Christian buildings than Jewish ones – feature inside, and the mix of Western and Oriental designs was chosen to reflect the diversity of the worshippers.

Then Interior Minister Bernard Cazeneuve visited the synagogue in January 2016, in solidarity with a local teacher who was attacked by a teenage Islamic State sympathiser. In September 2018, former President of France Nicolas Sarkozy spoke at the synagogue to denounce antisemitism.

== See also ==
- History of Marseille
- History of the Jews in France
- List of synagogues in France
