= History of Marseille =

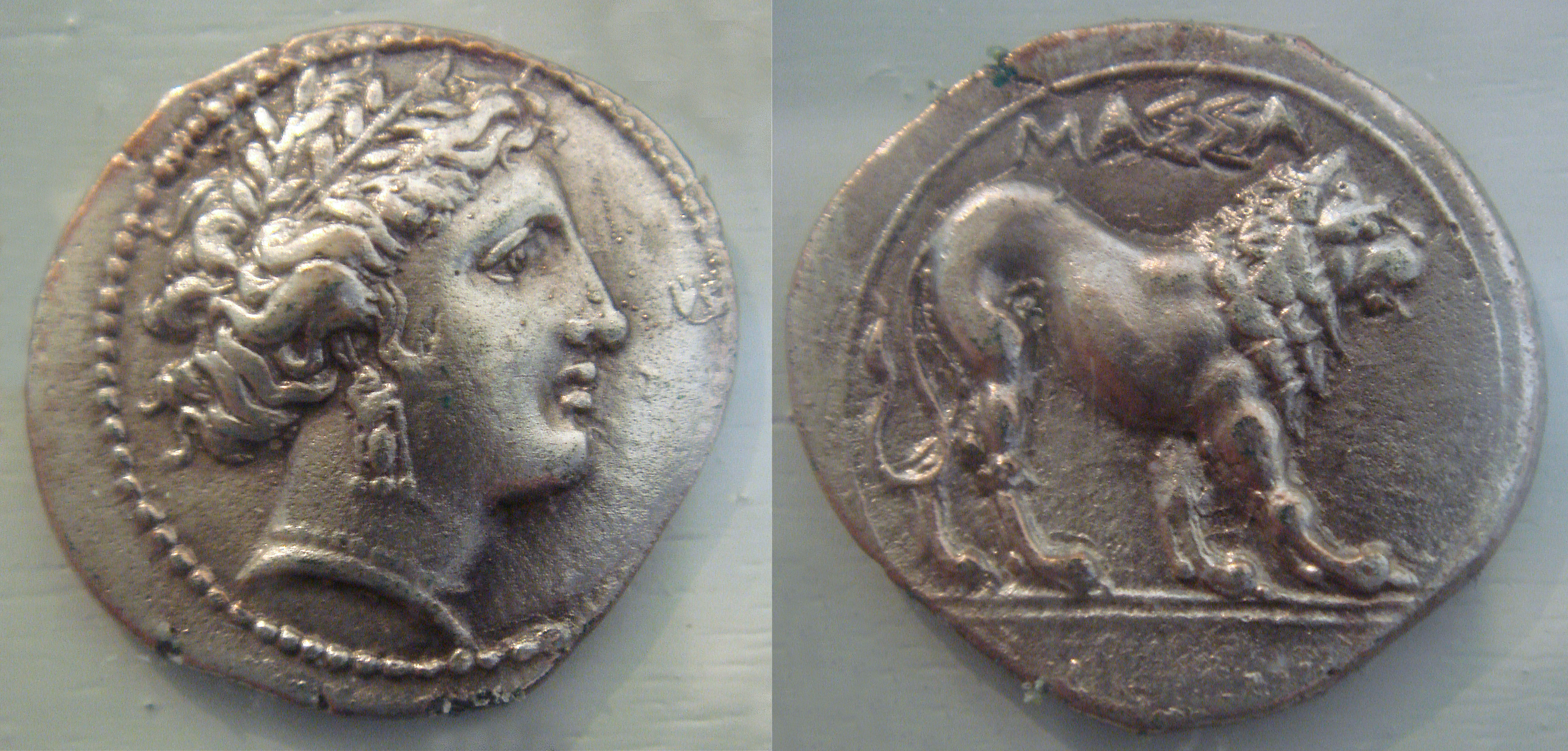
A silver drachma inscribed with MASSA[LIA] (ΜΑΣΣΑ[ΛΙΑ]), dated 375-200 BC, during the Hellenistic period of Marseille, bearing the head of the Greek goddess Artemis on the obverse and a lion on the reverse

Marseille, France was originally founded circa 600 BC as the Greek colony of Massalia (Latin: Massilia) and populated by Greeks from Phocaea (modern Foça, Turkey). It became the preeminent Greek polis in the Hellenized region of southern Gaul. The city-state allied with the Roman Republic against Carthage during the Second Punic War (218-201 BC), retaining its independence and commercial empire throughout the western Mediterranean even as Rome expanded into Western Europe and North Africa. However, the city lost its independence following the Roman Siege of Massilia in 49 BC, during Caesar's civil war, in which Massalia sided with the exiled faction at war with Julius Caesar.

Marseille continued to prosper as a Roman city, becoming an early center of Christianity during the Western Roman Empire. The city maintained its position as a premier maritime trading hub even after its capture by the Visigoths in the 5th century AD, although the city went into decline following the sack of 739 AD by the forces of Charles Martel. It became part of the County of Provence during the 10th century, although its renewed prosperity was curtailed by the Black Death of the 14th century and sack of the city by the Crown of Aragon in 1423. The city's fortunes rebounded with the ambitious building projects of René of Anjou, Count of Provence, who strengthened the city's fortifications during the mid-15th century. During the 16th century the city hosted a naval fleet with the combined forces of the Franco-Ottoman alliance, which threatened the ports and navies of Genoa and the Holy Roman Empire.

Marseille lost a significant portion of its population during the Great Plague of Marseille in 1720, but the population recovered by mid century. In 1792 the city became a focal point of the French Revolution and was the birthplace of France's national anthem, La Marseillaise. The Industrial Revolution and establishment of the French Empire during the 19th century allowed for further expansion of the city, although it was captured and heavily damaged by Nazi Germany during World War II. The city has since become a major center for immigrant communities from former French colonies, such as French Algeria.

== Prehistory ==
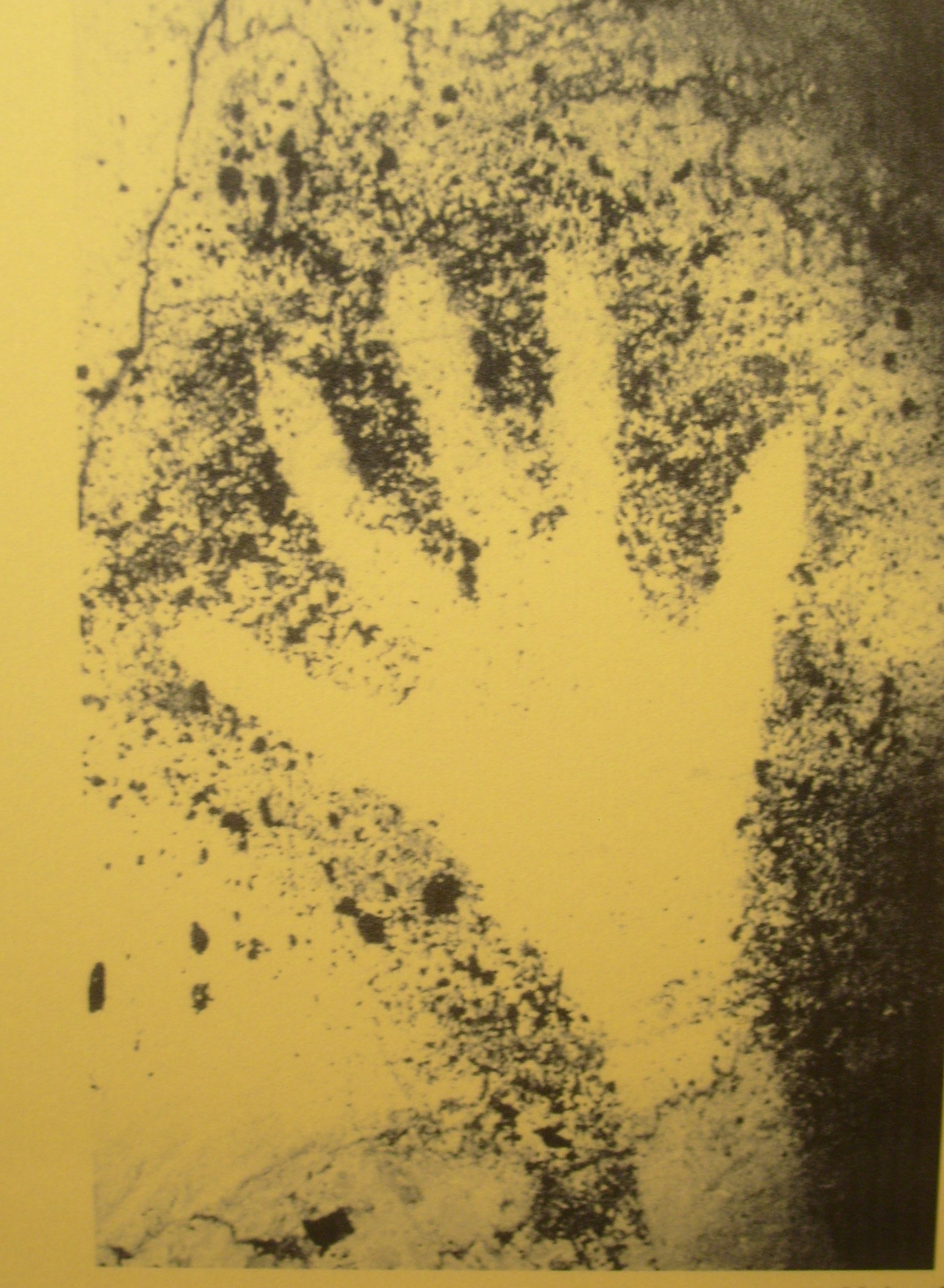
Prehistoric outline of human hand, Cosquer Cave

Humans have inhabited Marseille and its environs for almost 30,000 years: palaeolithic cave paintings in the underwater Cosquer Cave near the calanque of Morgiou date back to between 27,000 and 19,000 BC; and recent excavations near the railway station have unearthed neolithic brick habitations from around 6000 BC.

== Antiquity ==
Massalia, whose name was probably adapted from an existing language related to Ligurian, was the first Greek settlement in France. It was established within modern Marseille around 600 BC by colonists coming from Phocaea (now Foça, in modern Turkey) on the Aegean coast of Asia Minor. The connection between Massalia and the Phoceans is mentioned in Thucydides's Peloponnesian War; he notes that the Phocaean project was opposed by the Carthaginians, whose fleet was defeated. The founding of Massalia has also been recorded as a legend. According to the legend, Protis (in Aristotle, Euxenes), a native of Phocae, while exploring for a new trading outpost or emporion to make his fortune, discovered the Mediterranean cove of the Lacydon, fed by a freshwater stream and protected by two rocky promontories. Protis was invited inland to a banquet held by the chief of the local Ligurian tribe, Nann, for suitors seeking the hand of his daughter Gyptis (in Aristotle, Petta) in marriage. At the end of the banquet, Gyptis presented the ceremonial cup of wine to Protis, indicating her unequivocal choice. Following their marriage, they moved to the hill just to the north of the Lacydon; and from this settlement grew Massalia. Later, the natives would treacherously lay a plot to destroy the new colony, but the scheme was divulged and Conran, king of the natives, was killed in the ensuing battle. A second wave of colonists arrived in about 540, when Phocaea was destroyed by the Persians.

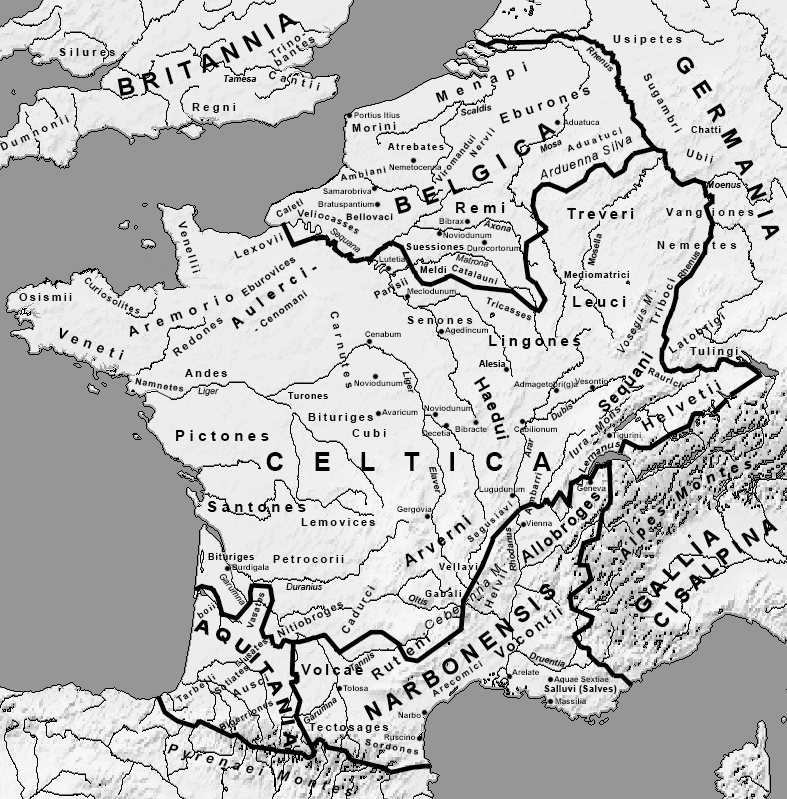
The state of Gaul around 58 BC.

Massalia became one of the major trading ports of the ancient world. At its height, in the 4th century BC, it had a population of about 50,000 inhabitants on about fifty hectares surrounded by a wall. It was governed as an aristocratic republic, with an assembly formed by the 600 wealthiest citizens. It had a large temple of the cult of Apollo of Delphi on a hilltop overlooking the port and a temple of the cult of Artemis of Ephesus at the other end of the city. The drachmas minted in Massalia were found in all parts of Ligurian-Celtic Gaul. Traders from Massalia ventured into France on the rivers Durance and Rhône and established overland trade routes to Switzerland and Burgundy, reaching as far north as the Baltic Sea. They exported their own products: local wine, salted pork and fish, aromatic and medicinal plants, coral, and cork. The most famous citizen of Massalia was the mathematician, astronomer and navigator Pytheas. Pytheas made mathematical instruments, which allowed him to establish almost exactly the latitude of Marseille, and he was the first scientist to observe that the tides were connected with the phases of the moon. Between 330 and 320 BC, he organized an expedition by ship into the Atlantic and as far north as England, and to visit Iceland, Shetland, and Norway, where he was the first scientist to describe drift ice and the midnight sun. Though he hoped to establish a sea trading route for tin from Cornwall, his trip was not a commercial success, and it was not repeated. The Massaliotes found it cheaper and simpler to trade with Northern Europe over land routes.

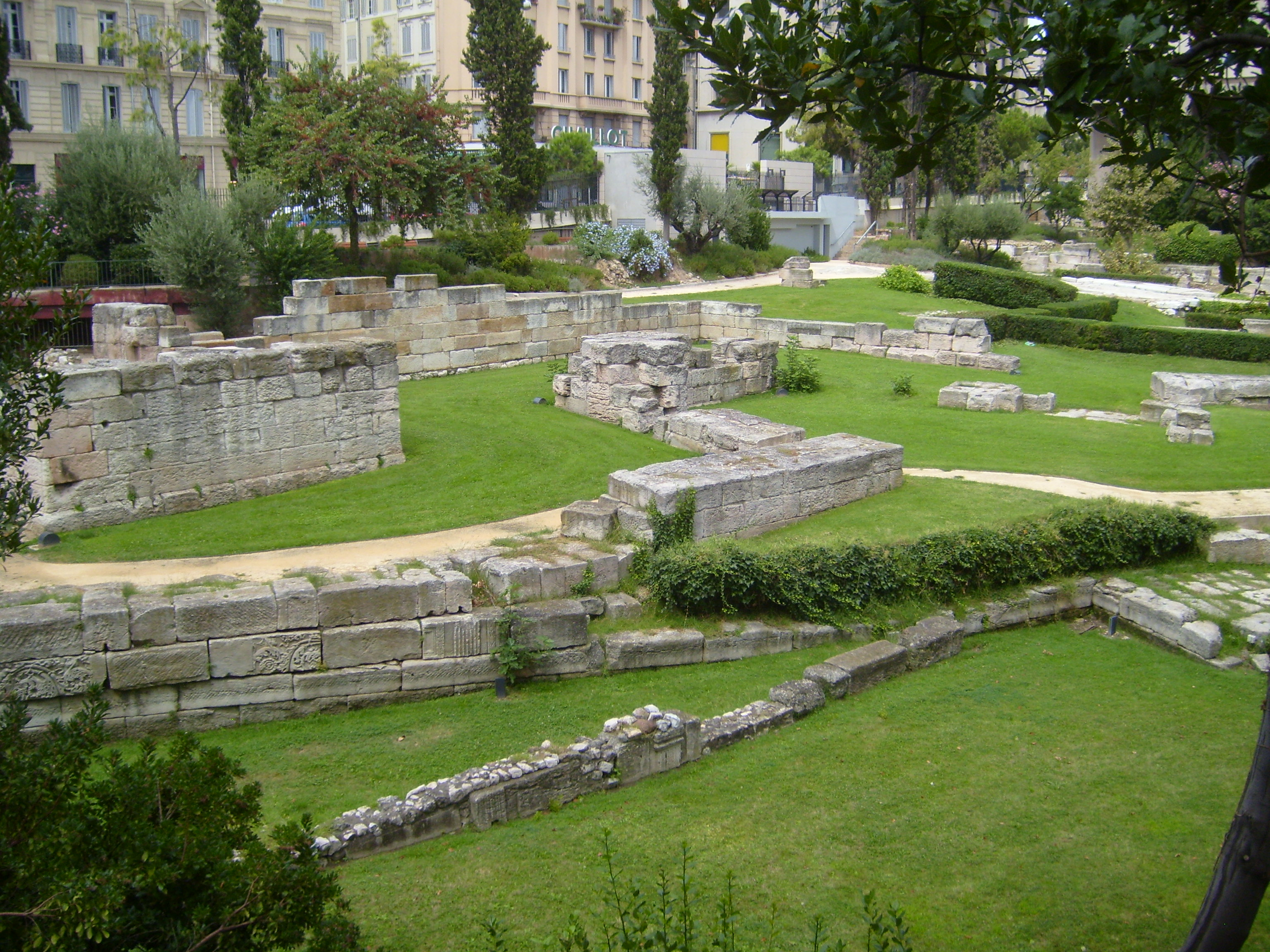
Jardin des Vestiges near the Vieux-Port with remains of the Hellenic harbour at Massalia

The city thrived by acting as a link between inland Gaul, hungry for Roman goods and wine (which Massalia was steadily exporting by 500 BC), and Rome's insatiable need for new products and slaves. During the Punic Wars, Hannibal crossed the Alps north of the city. In 123 BC, Massalia was faced by an invasion of the Allobroges and Arverni under Bituitus; it entered into an alliance with Rome, receiving protection—Roman legions under Q. Fabius Maximus and Gn. Domitius Ahenobarbus defeated the Gauls at Vindalium in 121 BC—in exchange for yielding a strip of land through its territory which was used to construct the Via Domitia, a road to Spain. The city thus maintained its independence a little longer, although the Romans organized their province of Transalpine Gaul around it and constructed a colony at Narbo Martius (Narbonne) in 118 BC which subsequently competed economically with Massalia.

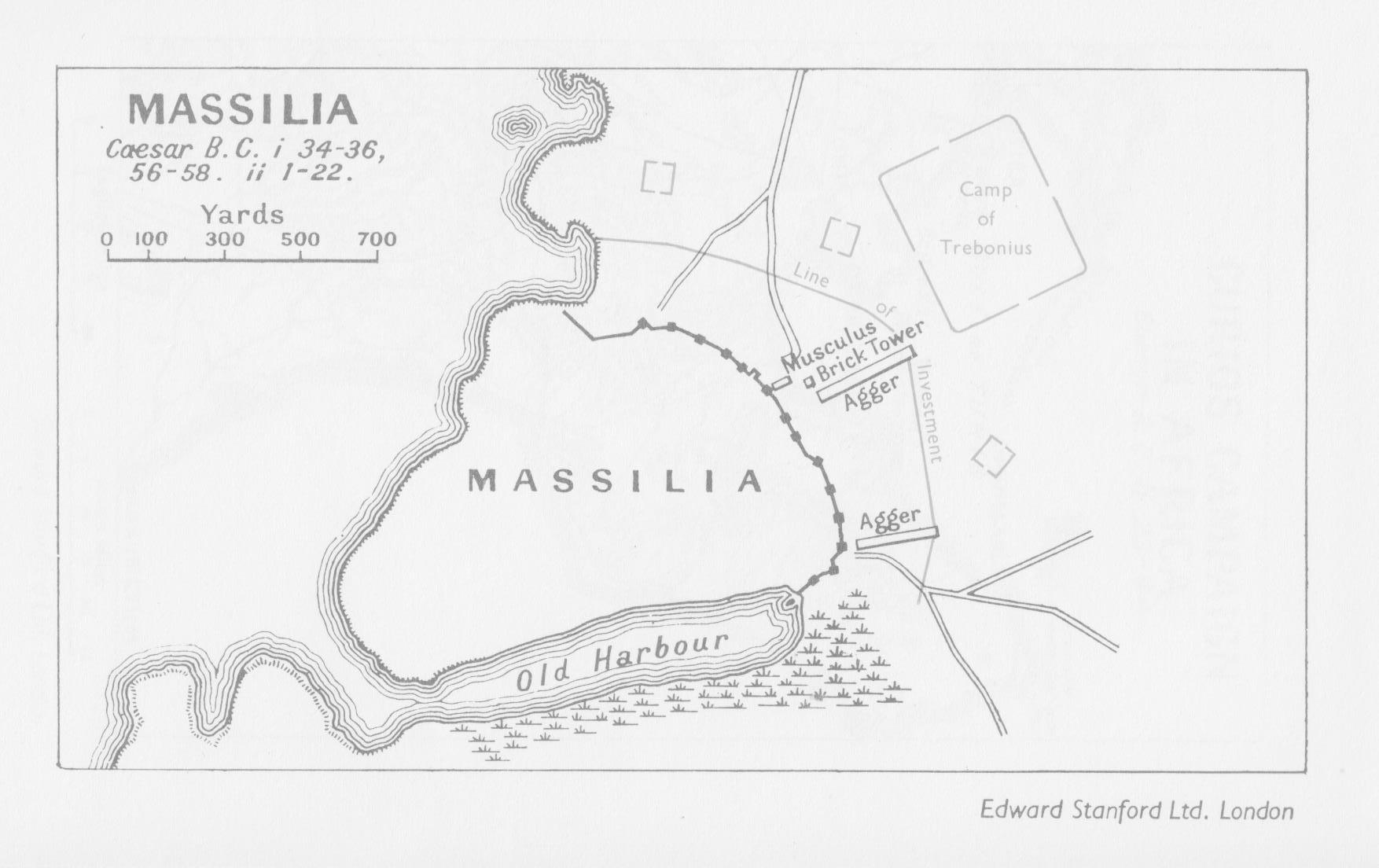
Massilia at the time of Caesar's siege in 49 BC.

During Julius Caesar's war against Pompey and most of the Senate, Massalia allied itself with the exiled government; closing its gates to Caesar on his way to Spain in April of 49 BC, the city was besieged. Despite reinforcement by L. Domitius Ahenobarbus, Massalia's fleet was defeated and the city fell by September. It maintained nominal autonomy but lost its trading empire and was largely brought under Roman dominion. The statesman Titus Annius Milo, then living in exile in Marseille, joked that no one could miss Rome as long as they could eat the delicious red mullet of Marseille. Marseille adapted well to its new status under Rome. Most of the archaeological remnants of the original Greek settlement were replaced by later Roman additions. During the Roman era, the city was controlled by a directory of 15 selected "first" among 600 senators. Three of them had the pre-eminence and the essence of the executive power. The city's laws among other things forbade the drinking of wine by women and allowed, by a vote of the senators, assistance to a person to commit suicide.

It was during this time that Christianity first appeared in Marseille, as evidenced by catacombs above the harbour and records of Roman martyrs. According to Provençal tradition, Mary Magdalen evangelised Marseille with her brother Lazarus. The diocese of Marseille became the Archdiocese of Marseille in 1948.

== Middle Ages and Renaissance ==
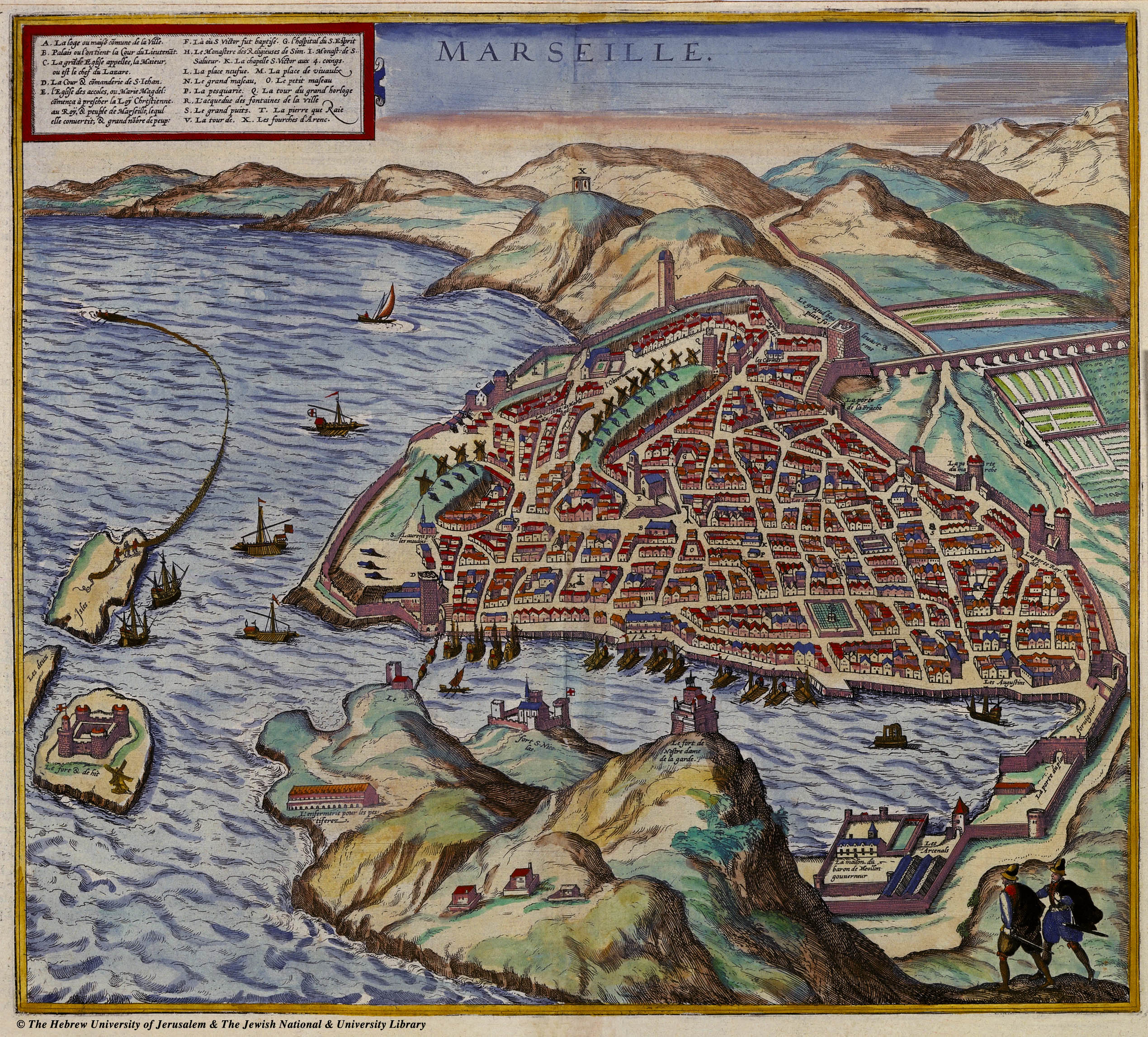
Marseille in 1575

The city was not affected by the decline of the Roman Empire before the 8th century, as Marseille enjoyed continued prosperity, probably thanks to its efficient defensive walls inherited from the Phoceans. Even after the town fell into the hands of the Visigoths in the 5th century, the city became an important Christian intellectual center with people such as John Cassian, Salvian and Sidonius Apollinaris. Marseille went on to a golden age in the 6th century as a major commercial center in the Mediterranean. Late Antiquity continued in the city until the 7th century, with Phocean and Roman infrastructure still in use (forums, baths). Marseille was occupied by Umayyad Arab forces in or before 736 at the invitation of the local ruler, duke Maurontus, as allies against his enemy Charles Martel. Marseille's prosperity ended suddenly in 739 when Martel's armies punished the city for rejecting Martel's appointed governor. The city did not develop again before the 10th century, as it suffered through 150 years of attacks by Greeks and Saracens.

The city regained much of its wealth and trading power in the 10th century under the counts of Provence. Between 1212 and 1218, the city was de facto governed by the Confraternity of the Holy Spirit.

The Counts of Provence allowed Marseille, governed by a consul, great autonomy until the rule of Raymond Berengar IV of Provence. Marseille initially resisted his assertion of control, but acknowledged his suzerainty in 1243. After his death, his daughter Beatrice of Provence married Louis IX of France's brother Charles I of Anjou in 1246, making him Count. Charles continued his father-in-law's administrative changes, which reignited discontent. Marseille rebelled in 1248, under the leadership of two local nobles, Barral of Baux and Boniface of Castellane, while Charles was embarked on the Seventh Crusade. Charles returned in 1250 and forced Marseille to surrender in 1252. Marseille rose up once more, in 1262, under Boniface of Castellane and Hugues des Baux, cousin of Barral des Baux (who remained loyal and helped contain the unrest). Charles quelled the revolt in 1263. Trade prospered, and Marseille gave him no further trouble. In 1348, the city suffered terribly from the bubonic plague, which continued to strike intermittently until 1361. As a major port, it is believed that Marseille was one of the first places in France to encounter the epidemic, and some 15,000 people died in a city that had a population of 25,000 during its period of economic prosperity in the previous century. The city's fortunes declined still further when it was sacked and pillaged by the Aragonese in 1423.

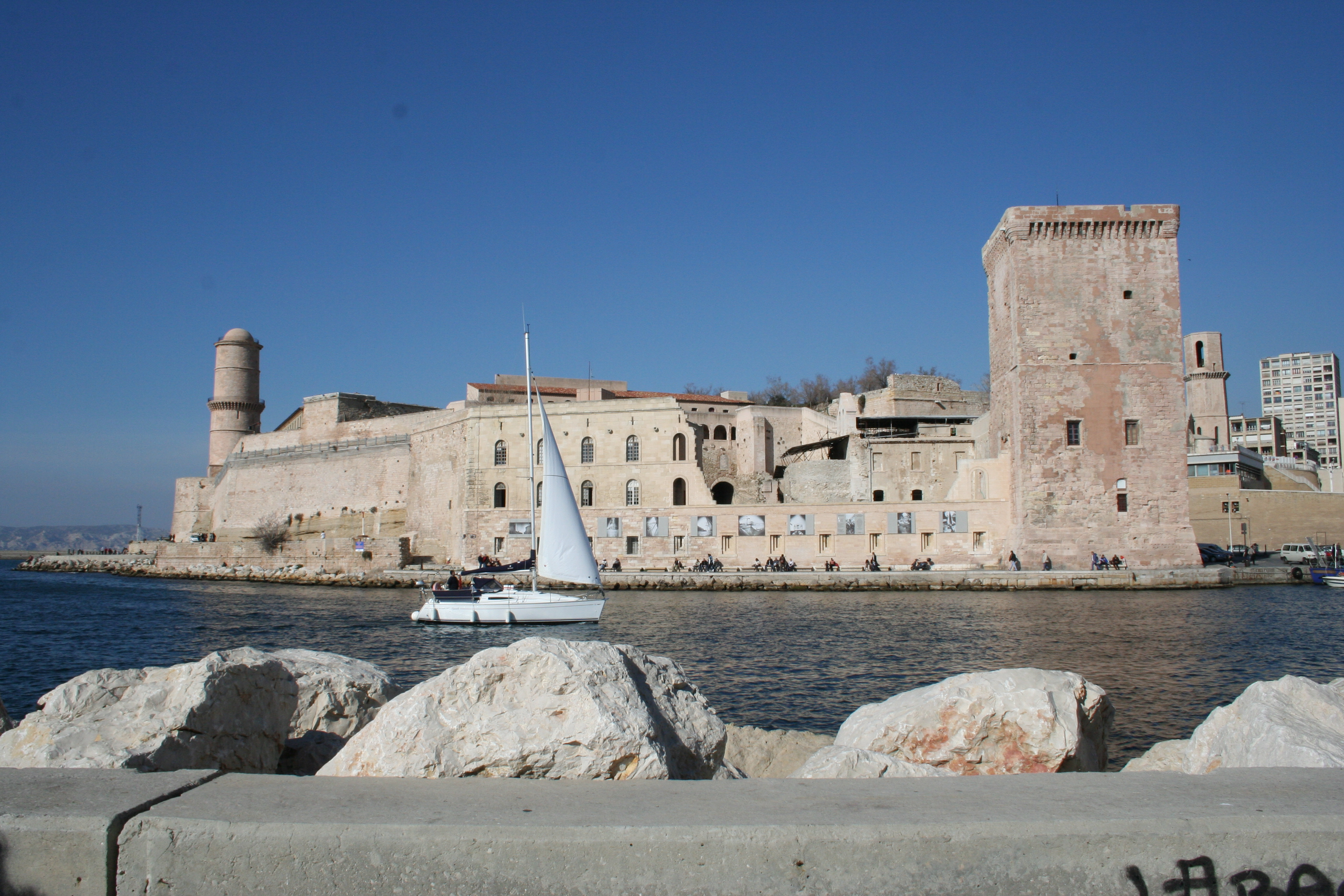
The 17C Fort Saint-Jean, incorporating the 12C Commandry of the Knights Hospitaller of St John and the 15C tower of René I

Marseille's population and trading status soon recovered and in 1437, the Count of Provence René of Anjou, who succeeded his father Louis II of Anjou as King of Sicily and Duke of Anjou, arrived in Marseille and established it as France's most fortified settlement outside of Paris. He helped raise the status of the town to a city and allowed certain privileges to be granted to it. Marseille was then used by the Duke of Anjou as a strategic maritime base to reconquer his kingdom of Sicily. King René, who wished to equip the entrance of the port with a solid defense, decided to build on the ruins of the old Maubert tower and to establish a series of ramparts guarding the harbour. Jean Pardo, engineer, conceived the plans and Jehan Robert, mason of Tarascon, carried out the work. The construction of the new city defenses took place between 1447 and 1453. Trading in Marseille also flourished as the Guild began to establish a position of power within the merchants of the city. Notably, René also founded the Corporation of Fisherman.

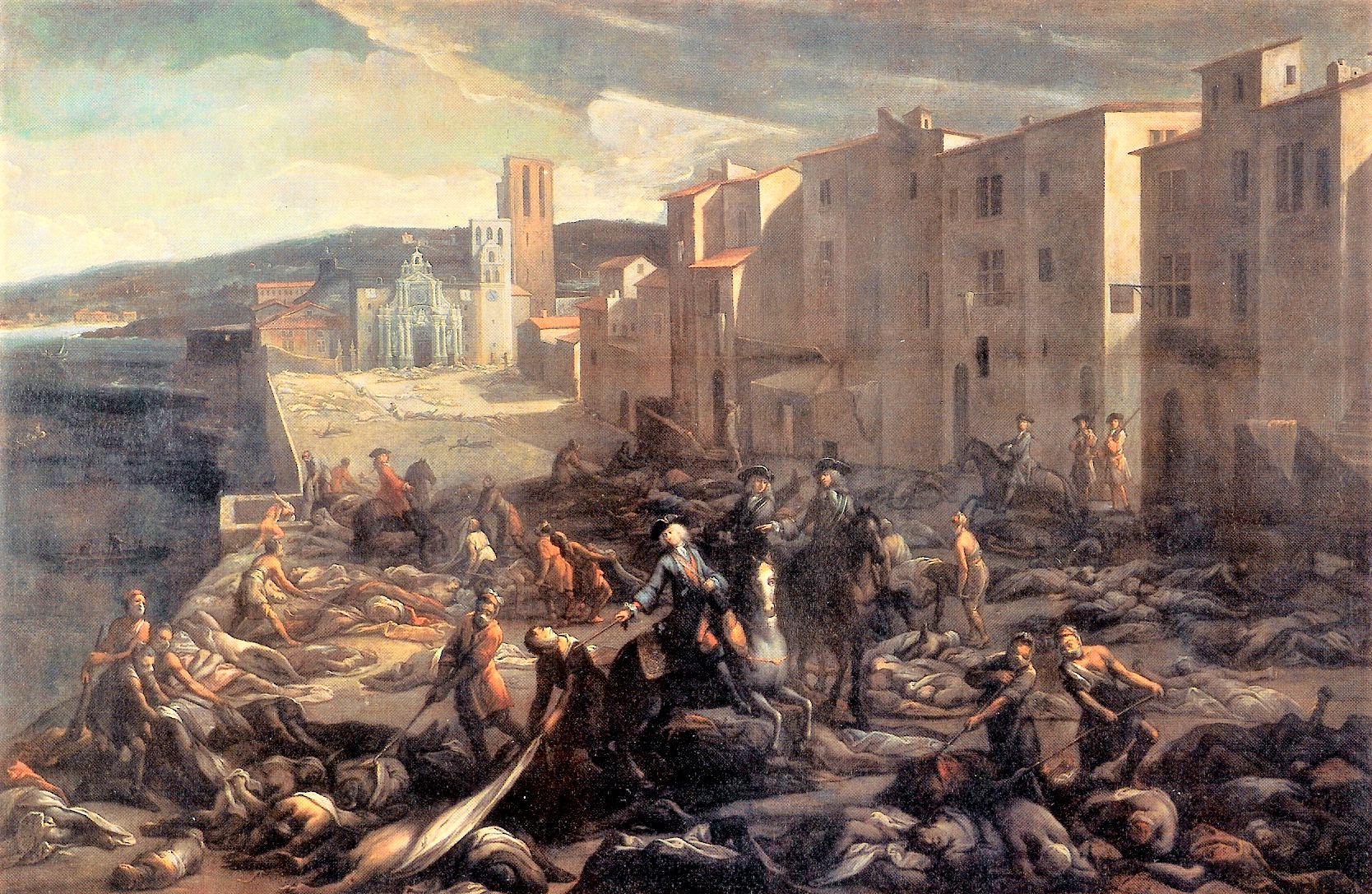
Contemporary engraving of Marseille during the Great Plague of 1720.

Marseille was united with Provence in 1481 and then incorporated into France the following year, but soon acquired a reputation for rebelling against the central government. Some 30 years after its incorporation, Francis I visited Marseille, drawn by his curiosity to see a rhinoceros that King Manuel I of Portugal was sending to Pope Leo X, but which had been landed on the Île d'If. As a result of this visit, the fortress of Château d'If was constructed; this did little to prevent Marseille being placed under siege by the army of the Holy Roman Empire a few years later. Marseille became a naval base for the Franco-Ottoman alliance in 1536, as a Franco-Turkish fleet was stationed in the harbour, threatening the Holy Roman Empire and especially Genoa. Towards the end of the 16th century, Marseille suffered yet another outbreak of the plague; the hospital of the Hôtel-Dieu was founded soon afterwards. A century later more troubles were in store: King Louis XIV himself had to descend upon Marseille, at the head of his army, in order to quash a local uprising against the governor. As a consequence, the two forts of Saint-Jean and Saint-Nicholas were erected above the harbour and a large fleet and arsenal were established in the harbour itself. The Hôtel de Ville was completed in 1673.

== 18th and 19th centuries ==
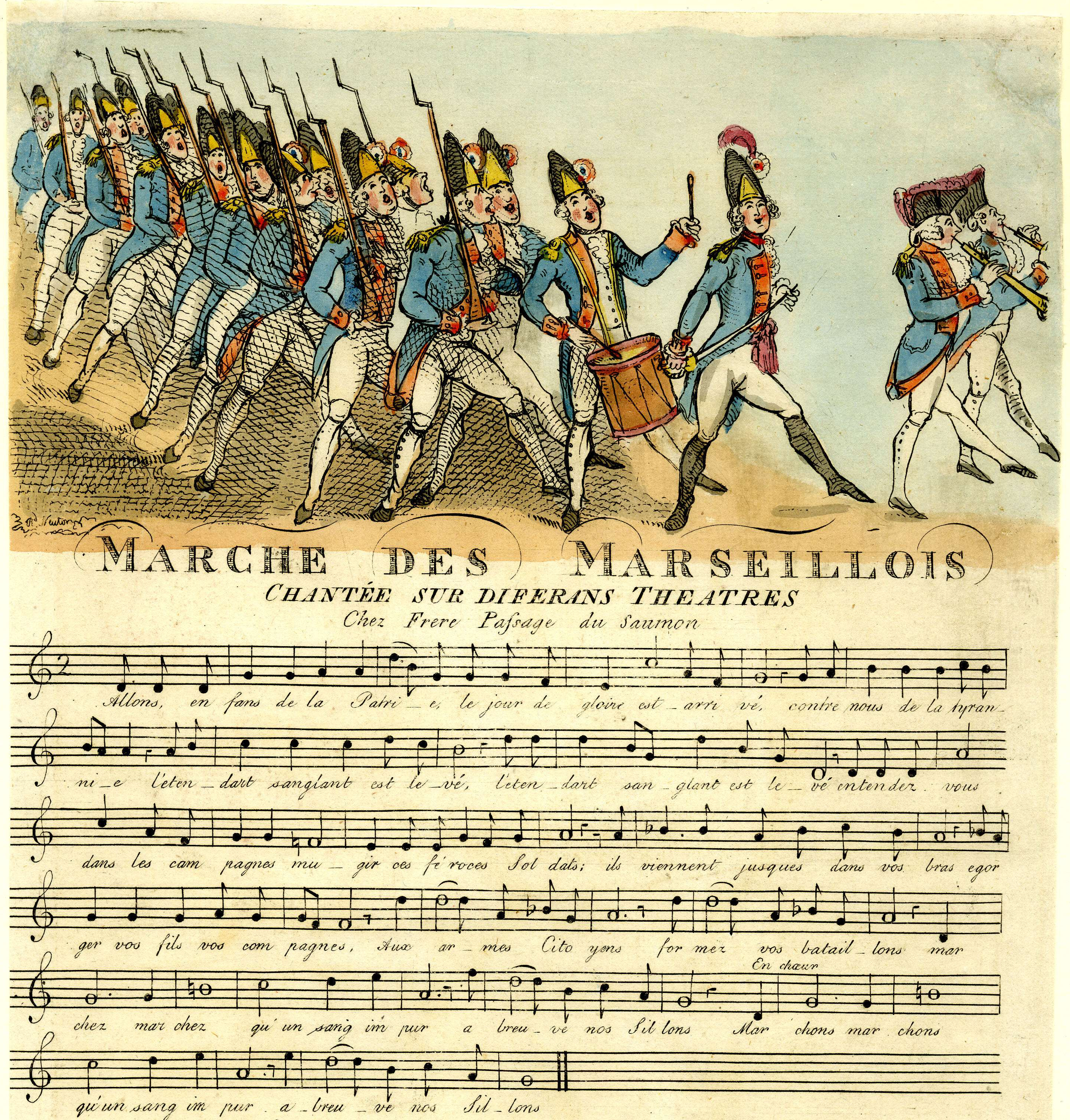
La Marseillaise, 1792

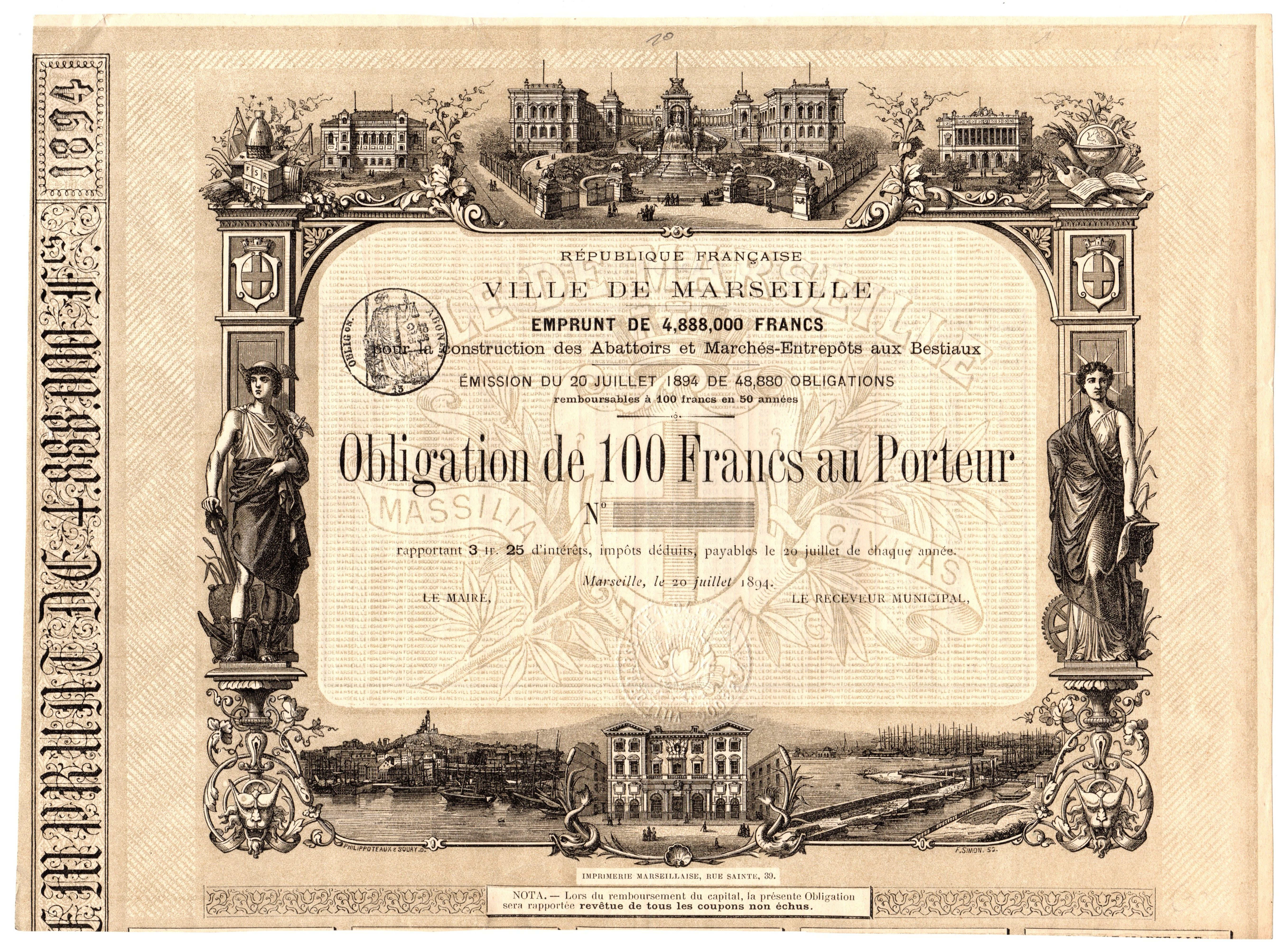
Bond of the City of Marseille from the 20. July 1894, unissued

Over the course of the 18th century, the port's defences were improved and Marseille became more important as France's leading military port in the Mediterranean. In 1720, the last Great Plague of Marseille, a form of the Black Death, killed 100,000 people in the city and the surrounding provinces. Jean-Baptiste Grosson, royal notary, wrote from 1770 to 1791 the historical Almanac of Marseille, published as Recueil des antiquités et des monuments marseillais qui peuvent intéresser l'histoire et les arts ("Collection of antiquities and Marseille monuments which can interest history and the arts"), which for a long time was the primary resource on the history of the monuments of the city.

The local population enthusiastically embraced the French Revolution and sent 500 volunteers to Paris in 1792 to defend the revolutionary government; their rallying call to revolution, sung on their march from Marseille to Paris, became known as La Marseillaise, which on 14 July 1795 first became the national anthem of France. In 1793, the Federalists rose against the Jacobins, and after the more moderate revolutionaries were squeezed out the rebellion became a monarchist fight against the republic. After the latter's victory, the city is renamed Ville-sans-nom ("Nameless-City") in punishment.

During the 19th century, the city was the site of industrial innovations and growth in manufacturing. The rise of the French Empire and the conquests of France from 1830 onward (notably Algeria) stimulated the maritime trade and raised the prosperity of the city. Maritime opportunities also increased with the opening of the Suez Canal in 1869. This period in Marseille's history is reflected in many of its monuments, such as the Napoleonic obelisk at Mazargues and the royal triumphal arch on the Place Jules Guesde.

Coinciding with, and in support of, the Paris Commune of 1871, the populace established a commune of their own with the aid of local sections of the National Guard. The Commune was quickly suppressed by the army.

== 1900 up to World War II ==
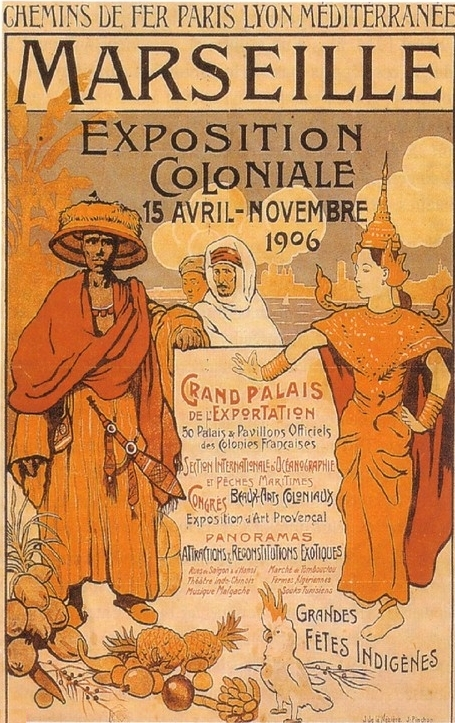
David Dellepiane: poster for 1906 colonial exhibition

During the first half of the 20th century, Marseille celebrated its "port of the empire" status through the colonial exhibitions of 1906 and 1922; the monumental staircase of the railway station, glorifying French colonial conquests, dates from then. In 1934, Alexander I of Yugoslavia arrived at the port to meet with the French foreign minister Louis Barthou. He was assassinated there by Vlado Chernozemski.

Marseille in this period was home to a major influx of immigrants from Corsica, and a diaspora community of Corsicans flourished in the city, beginning with the arrival of the first Corsicans in the 1880s. These Corsicans were mostly poor and agrarian, seeking jobs and better opportunities in the urban mainland. Marseille became known as "the first Corsican city" and the "capital of Corsica".

These Corsicans, mostly concentrated around working-class neighbourhoods near the old port, held a strong connection to their so-called clans, as armed clans were common in a then very decentralised Corsica. This clan system eventually transformed to a system of organised crime, creating the Corsican mafia. Often, poor Corsicans, lacking social opportunity due to discrimination and extreme poverty, could only make a living through organised crime. Many Corsicans also enlisted to join the colonial army after being promised money and an escape from poverty. 22% of French colonial soldiers were Corsican, despite Corsicans being around 2% of the French population at the time.

Corsicans became an important political bloc in Marseille, and many working-class Corsicans in the city became either socialists or communists in the early 1900s. In the 1920s, Corsicans rallied around emerging left-wing politician Simon Sabiani, a member of the Corsican diaspora born in Casamaccioli. Sabiani, alongside mayor Siméon Flaissières, became the face of the left in the city. Sabiani began to dominate the political scene of Marseille. Although in theory only an advisor to the mayor, Sabiani in practice ran the city alongside the Corsican mafia, who he had long-standing connections with.

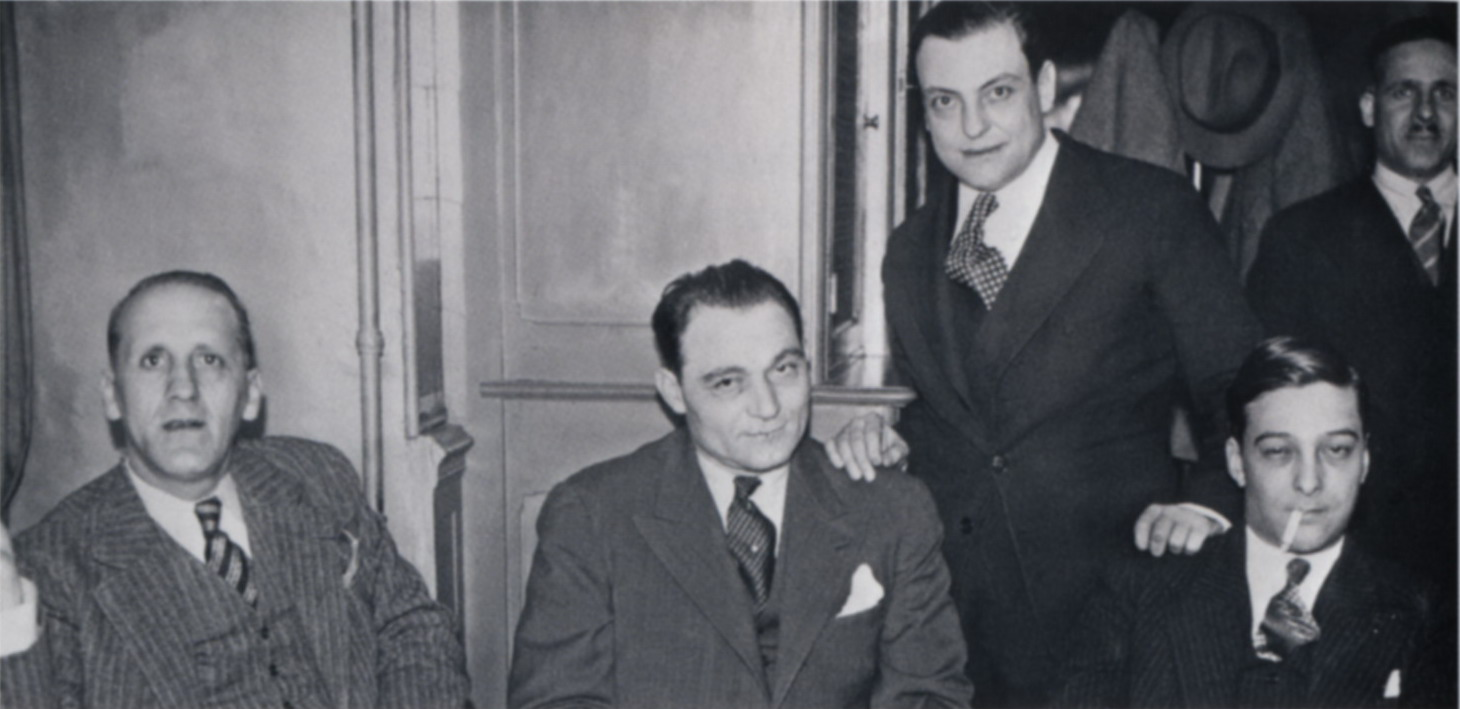
Simon Sabiani (left) with Corsican gangsters Paul Carbone and François Spirito

The Corsican mafia controlled many parts of daily life in Marseille, and the organisation had grown extremely large. They had connections to nearly every political figure in the city, including Sabiani, all of his allies, and even Henri Tasso, Sabiani's rival. Tasso was elected mayor in 1935.

Sabiani, following Tasso's election, was expelled from most of the left. As a result, he rallied around right-wing former PCF dissident Jacques Doriot and joined his party, the French Popular Party. Sabiani became the Popular Party's leader in Marseille and became known as the "Mussolini of Marseille". Some clans of the Corsican mafia, notably ones led by Paul Carbone and François Spirito, worked extensively with him to consolidate his power in Marseille.

During the Second World War, Marseille was bombed by German and Italian forces in 1940. Marseille was administrated as part of Vichy regime. Sabiani was an important figure of the Vichy regime in Marseille, partly governing the city and organising the city's branch of the Legion of French Volunteers against Bolshevism. The French Resistance put him on a list of collaborators to kill. Sabiani was brought by the Germans to represent Marseille in the Sigmaringen government in 1944, and later fled to Italy, Argentina, and finally Spain. The city was occupied by the Germans from November 1942 to August 1944. On 22 January 1943, over 4,000 Jews were seized in Marseille as part of "Action Tiger". They were held in detention camps before being deported to Poland occupied by Nazi Germany to be murdered. The Old Port was destroyed in January 1943 by the Germans. The city was liberated by the Allies on 29 August 1944. As a part of Operation Dragoon, General Joseph de Goislard de Monsabert led roughly 130,000 French troops to liberate the city.

== Marseille after World War II ==
After the war, much of the city was rebuilt during the 1950s. The governments of East Germany, West Germany and Italy paid massive reparations, plus compound interest, to compensate civilians killed, injured, left homeless or destitute as a result of the war.

The Corsican mafia continued its heavy presence in the city it established before the second world war. The mafia, alongside American mobster Lucky Luciano, devised the French connection, a system of heroin trafficking which became the world's largest drug trafficking network. The French connection was dismantled in the 1970s, which hindered the growth of the Corsican mafia, but its influence prevails to this day.

From the 1950s onward, the city served as an entrance port for over a million immigrants to France. In 1962, there was a large influx from the newly independent Algeria, including around 150,000 returned Algerian settlers (pieds-noirs). Many immigrants have stayed and given the city a French-African quarter with a large market.

In December 1994, the Marseille Provence Airport was where the GIGN stormed Air France Flight 8969, which had been hijacked by 4 GIA terrorists. All four hijackers were killed and the passengers were freed.

In the 21st century Marseille regularly attracts media attention due to drug trafficking and shootings that take place especially in the north of the city.

== See also ==
- Timeline of Marseille
- Marseille Commune
