= Geoffroy Velten =

French brewer, newspaper proprietor and politician

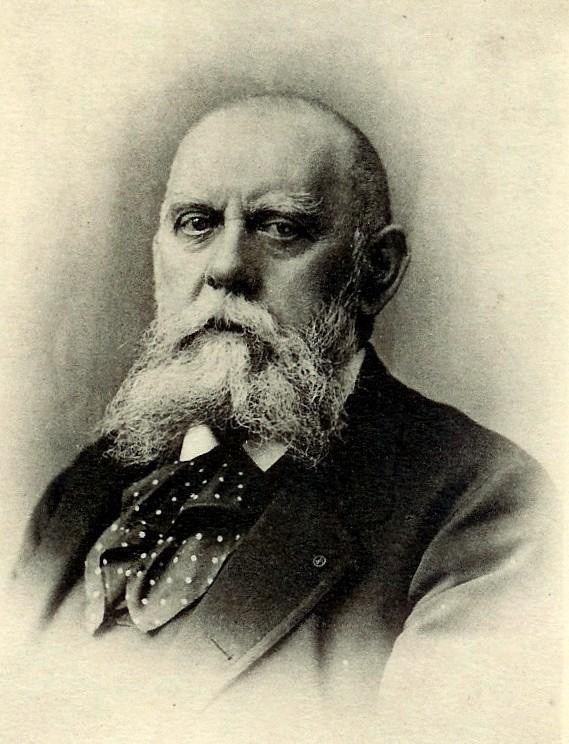
- Velten around 1910
- Born: Godfried Velten; 10 September 1831; Brumath, Bas-Rhin, France
- Died: 21 September 1915 (aged 84); Paris, France
- Occupation: Brewer
- Known for: Senator for Bouches-du-Rhône

Geoffroy Velten, or Godfried Velten (10 September 1831 – 21 September 1915) was a French brewer, newspaper proprietor and politician who became a member of the Senate of France.

== Early career ==
Godfried Velten was born in Brumath, Bas-Rhin, on 10 September 1831. At the age of 17 he moved to Marseille in 1848 with his uncle. He began work in a brewery in Marseille. He became an independent brewer in 1861, and made about 2,000 hectolitres (44,000 imp gal; 53,000 US gal) of beer in the first year. In 1869 he installed ice-making equipment with capacity of 20,000 kilograms (44,000 lb) per day for use in his brewery and for sale locally.

Velten became a political activist and helped with the elections of Léon Gambetta in 1868 and of Henri-François-Alphonse Esquiros in 1869. During the Franco-Prussian War of 1870 he joined the 1st battalion of the National Guard. He created a relief fund to help families in need whose sons were in the army. He was president of this society and donated 1,000 francs per month for the duration of the war. He donated two machine guns for the national defense. He was a co-founder of the Société d'Alsace-Lorraine in 1871, and was vice-president until 1877. Velten became a municipal councilor in Marseille in 1874, and a councilor-general in Bouches-du-Rhône in 1879.

From 1874 to 1876 Velten made 1,000,000 kilograms (2,200,000 lb) of ice each year to supply ships in the trade with China. In 1879 he built a pneumatic maltery, the only one of its type in France. By 1880 his brewery was producing 25,000 hectolitres (550,000 imp gal; 660,000 US gal) per year. In 1881 he sold his brewery for a considerable fortune. He was made a knight of the Legion of Honor on 30 December 1881 and was promoted to Officer of the Legion of Honor on 30 March 1885.

== Newspaper proprietor ==
Velten founded the newspapers L'Égalité, La Jeune république (The Young Republic), and Le Petit Provençal. The journalist, poet and politician Clovis Hugues (1851–1907) was editor of La Jeune Republique from 1876 to 1881, and editor-in-chief in 1879. Le Petit Provençal first appeared in 1880. It was based in Marseille and distributed in south eastern France. The paper competed with others such as Le Petit Marseillais, Le Radical and Le Soleil du Midi. At first the newspaper published opinions and polemics, but later it became a source of news and information. Le Petit Provençal called itself a Socialist Republican newspaper, but was never the official organ of the socialists. Between 1890 and 1900 it supported socialist candidates of all camps, including Guesdists.

== Senator ==
On 6 January 1885 Velten was selected as the Republican candidate in the Senate by-election to replace Eugène Pelletan, who had died. He was elected as senator for Bouches-du-Rhône on 25 January 1885. He received 224 votes out of 402. In the Senate he agreed with the expulsion of the princes, supported the new military law, supported the restoration of district elections on 13 February 1889, and was in favor of the draft Lisbonne law defining restrictions on the freedom of the press. He supported the action of the High Court against General Boulanger.

Velten was reelected to the Senate in the general elections of 7 January 1894 by 232 out of 411 in the first round, and in the general elections of 4 January 1903 by 255 votes out of 425 in the first round. He joined the Democratic Left group, of which he was a founder. After 1889 he did not often speak in the chamber. He introduced the bill on operation and maintenance of the Alpilles canal, and the bill on sanitation of the city of Marseille. On 15 November 1906 he co-signed an order of the day trusting the government of Georges Clemenceau to ensure that the railways met the needs of the country. In 1906 he supported the religious policy of the government. He did not seek reelection, and left office on 6 January 1912. Geoffroy Velten died in Paris on 21 September 1915, aged 84.

== Sources ==
- "Avis de décès Velton Geoffroy". Base Léonore.
- Beudot, Françoise-Albane (1999). David Dellepiane: Peintre, affichiste, illustrateur. Editions Parenthèses. p. 150. ISBN 978-2-86364-098-2.
- Chambre des députés (1881). Annales: Débats parlementaires. Imprimerie du journal officiel.
- "Etat de Services de Velten Godfried". Base Léonore.
- "Godfried Velten (1831-1915), sénateur des Bouches-du-Rhône". GénéProvence (in French). 2014-09-08.
- Jolly, Jean (1977). "VELTEN (GODFRIED)". Dictionnaire des Parlementaires français.
- "Légion d'Honneur – Veltren – Officier". Base Léonore (in French). 1885.
- "Le Petit provençal". SUDOC: Système Universitaire de Documentation.
- Olivesi, A. (January–March 1964). "Les Socialistes marseillais et le problème colonial". Le Mouvement Social (in French) (46). Editions l'Atelier on behalf of Association Le Mouvement Social: 27–65. doi:10.2307/3777263. JSTOR 3777263.
- Robert, Adolphe; Cougny, Gaston (1889). "VELTEN (GODFRIED)". Dictionnaire des Parlementaires français (in French).
- Schweitz, Arlette (2001). Les parlementaires de la Seine sous la Troisième République: Etudes. Publications de la Sorbonne. ISBN 978-2-85944-432-7.
- Sénat de France (2015-09-15). "VELTEN Geoffroy".
