= Palais de la Bourse (Marseille) =

Building in Marseille, France

Coordinates: 43°17′45″N 5°22′31″E

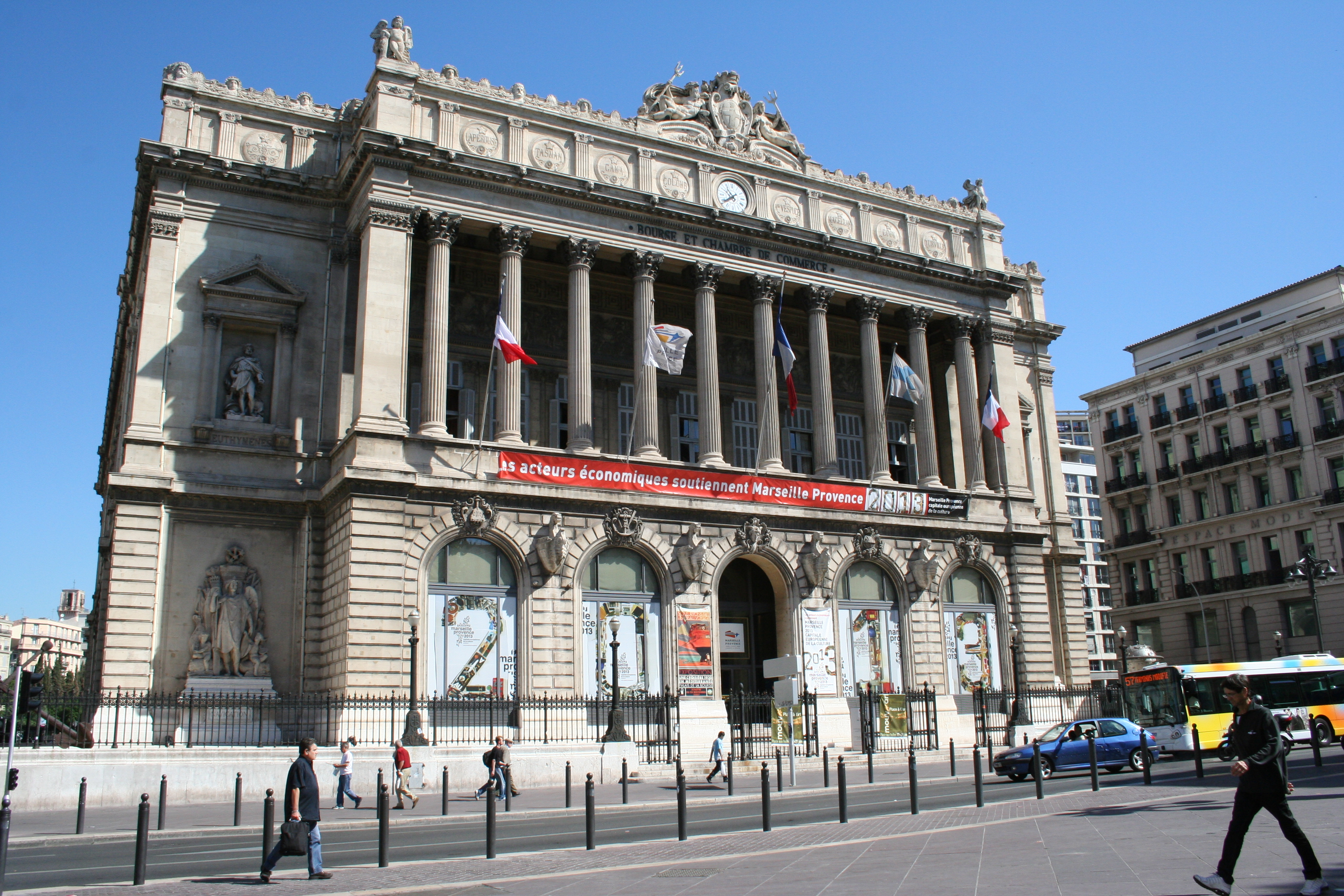

The Palais de la Bourse is a building on the Canebière in Marseille, France. It houses the Chamber of Commerce and Industry Aix Marseille Provence, as well as the Musée de la Marine et de l'Économie de Marseille.

== See also ==
- List of works by Eugène Guillaume
