= Samuel Leigh (bookseller) =

Samuel Leigh (c.1780 – 11 August 1831) was a bookseller and publisher in 19th century London. His office stood on the Strand. From around 1806 to 1814 he conducted business with James Mathews in the partnership of "Mathews and Leigh." He also married Mathews' daughter. Leigh died by his own hand in 1831.

== Leigh's travel guides ==
In the 1820s–1830s Leigh issued a series of eponymous travel guide books to Europe. He also published travel writing by authors such as Edmund Boyce, Johann Gottfried Ebel, Edward Planta, Heinrich August Ottokar Reichard, and Mariano Vasi.

== See also ==
- James Mathews Leigh, son of Samuel Leigh
