= Parc Borély =

Public municipal park in Marseille, France

Coordinates: 43.2597°N 5.3805°E

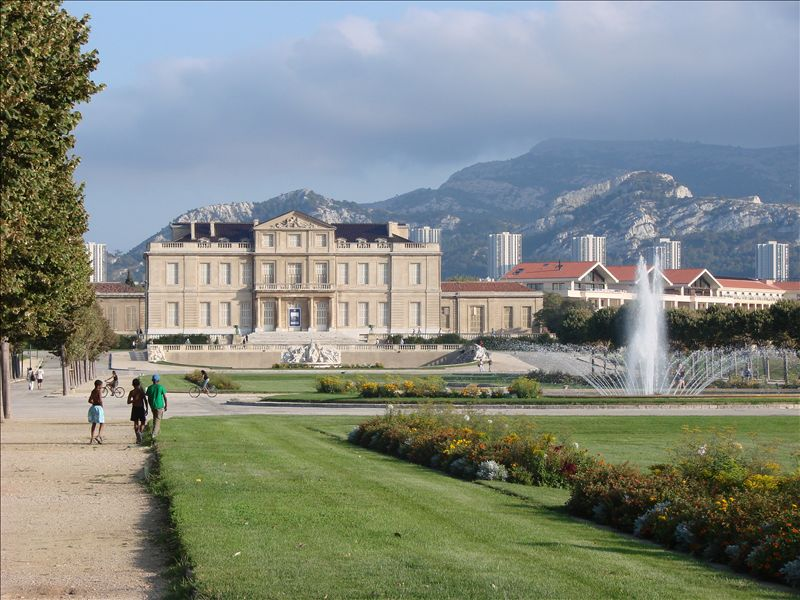
Château Borély with Parc Borély's French formal garden

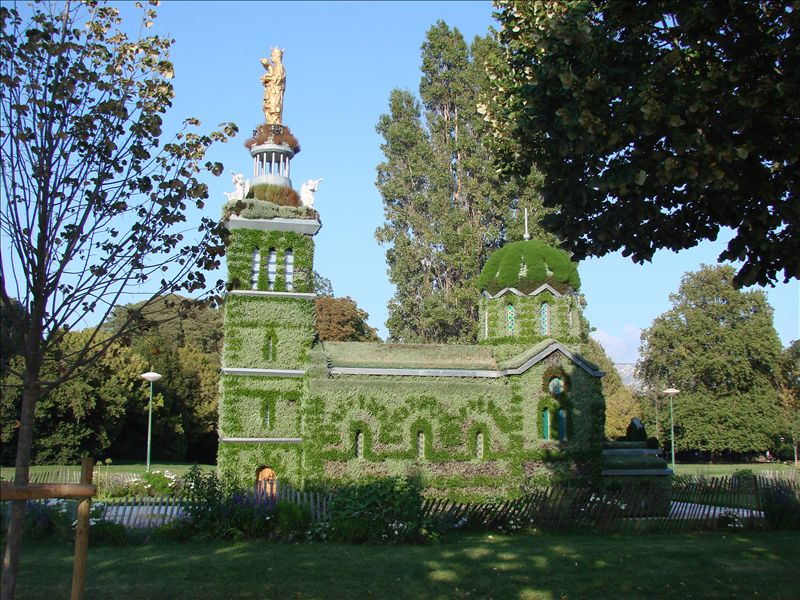
Replica of Notre-Dame de la Garde in the English garden

Parc Borély (French pronunciation: [paʁk bɔʁeli]; lit. 'Borély Park') is a public municipal park in the 8th arrondissement of Marseille, France. It is classified by the Ministry of Culture as one of the Remarkable Gardens of France. The park is 17 hectares in size. It adjoins the Jardin botanique E.M. Heckel.

== Description ==
Parc Borély has three different gardens: a French formal garden, facing the bastide, composed of two lawns with a circular basin between them, and two double rows of trees aligning with the Avenue du Parc-Borély between the Avenue du Prado and the gates of the park; an English landscape garden, on the east side of the park, surrounding a pond, and decorated with statues, fountains, a cascade, and a playground – it also featured a miniature of the basilica of Notre-Dame de la Garde; and a rose garden (roseraie) north of the English garden. A path along the Huveaune connects the park with the Plages du Prado on the Mediterranean Sea.

== History ==
The park was created in the 17th century by a French ship owner and merchant, Joseph Borély, who bought land for a country house, the Château Borély, in the area of Marseille called Bonneveine. The estate was enlarged in the 18th century by Joseph Borély, who constructed a bastide, or Provençal country house, on the domaine. When Louis-Joseph Borély inherited the domaine in 1770, he commissioned the landscape architect Embry to create a garden à la française.

In the middle of the 19th century, the land passed first to Paulin Talabot, director of the new PLM railroad which connected Paris to Marseille; and then the land was acquired by the city of Marseille. The city commissioned landscape architect Jean-Charles Adolphe Alphand to design a park with three distinct parts; a French garden, an English landscape park, and a track for horse racing by the side of the sea. A number of wooden pavilions were constructed; just one remains, the former pavilion by the lake, which had also served as a botanical laboratory of the Institut colonial.

From 1880 until 1915, the park was the site of a botanical garden, which moved to a different site adjoining the park. In 2002, a promenade of two hectares was laid out between the park and sea.

== Sources ==
- Page on the official site of the French Committee of Parks and Gardens (in French)
