= Le Petit Provençal =

French provincial daily newspaper

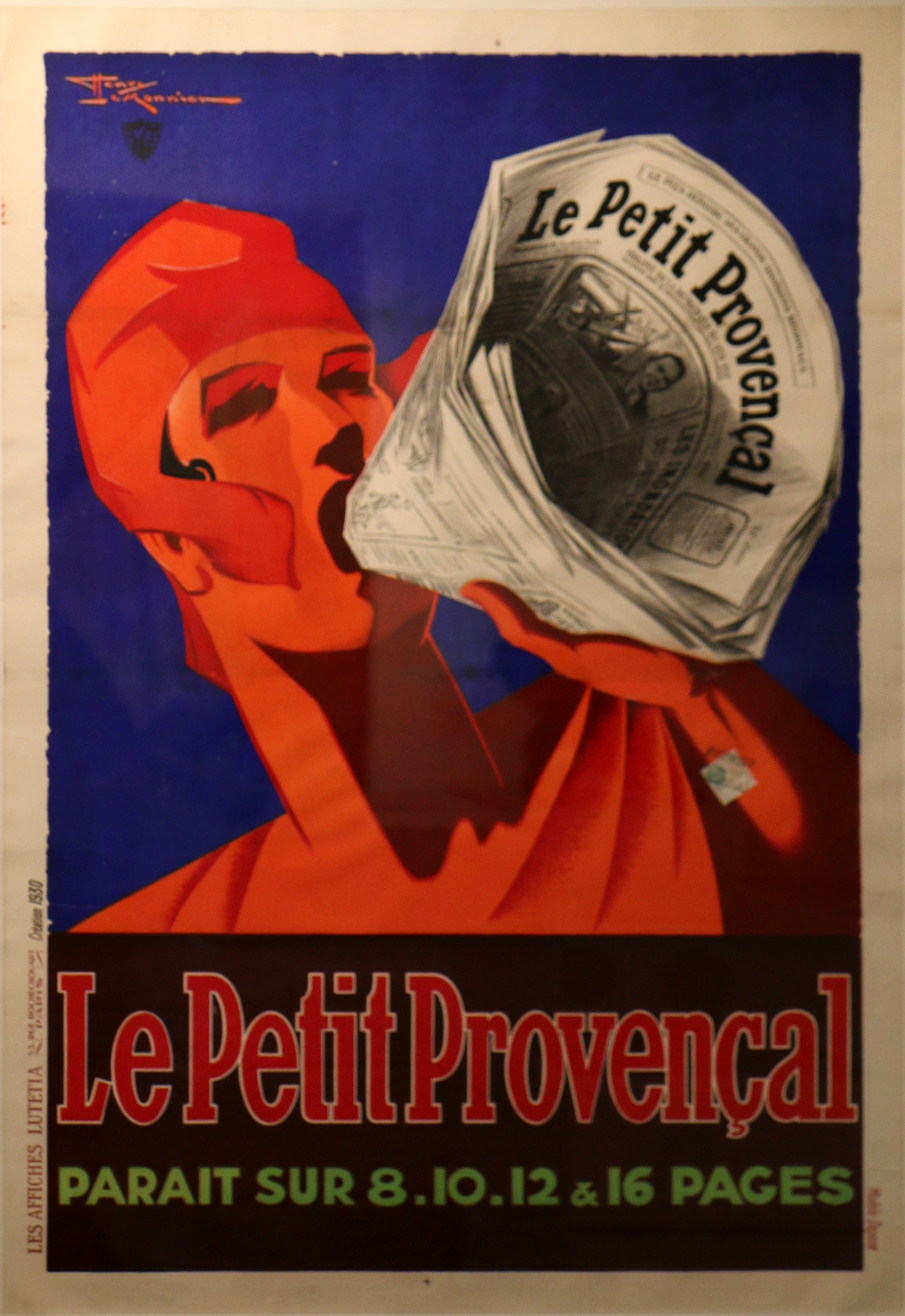
- Poster for Le Petit Provençal
- Type: Daily newspaper
- Founded: 1880
- Ceased publication: 1944
- Language: French
- Headquarters: Marseille, France
- City: Marseille
- Country: France
- ISSN: 1257-5984

Le Petit Provençal (The Little Provençal) was a French provincial daily newspaper founded in Marseille in 1880. It took a Left Republican position, although it was never an official socialist organ. In the years before World War I (1914–18) many prominent politicians contributed to the paper. The paper opposed the pact between Germany and Russia just before World War II (1939–45), and after the fall of France opposed the Vichy regime. However, it managed to continue publication until 1944.

== History ==
Le Petit Provençal was founded in Marseille in 1880, and distributed in south eastern France. It was originally titled La Jeune république (The Young Republic). The founder was Geoffroy Velten (1831–1915), also called Godfried Velten, a Protestant entrepreneur and militant Republican who became a Municipal Councillor in Marseilles in 1880, and on 25 January 1883 was made Senator for Bouches-du-Rhône. Velten also founded L'Égalité. The paper competed with others such as Le Petit Marseillais, Le Radical and Le Soleil du Midi. At first the newspaper published opinions and polemics, but later it became a source of news and information. Thus, during the campaign in Madagascar, from September 1894 to December 1896 Le Petit Provençal devoted 95 editorials or feature articles on the front page to colonial issues.

Le Petit Provençal paper called itself a Socialist Republican newspaper, but was never the official organ of the socialists. Between 1890 and 1900 it supported socialist candidates of all camps, including Guesdists. Regular contributors included Alexandre Millerand, René Viviani, Gustave Rouanet, Clovis Hugues and Léon Mirman. André Joseph Lefèvre wrote for Le Petit Provençal in the period before World War I (1914–18). During the period leading up to 1914 the paper emphasized that it supported both radicals and socialists. The circulation was 40,000–50,000 in 1902. While papers at the time usually gave false circulation figures Le Petit Provençal by 1913 probably had a daily circulation of about 100,000. Advertising only filled 20% or so of the pages.

By 1914 Le Petit Provençal had a circulation of 100,000–110,000 in 1914, mostly among the working-class people of Marseilles, although it also sold in the rural parts of the department and in the center of the city, where it faced fierce competition from Le Petit Marseillais. Le Petit Provençal continued to take a socialist position after World War I. After the war the socialist Marcel Déat contributed to the newspaper. Le Petit Provençal became the regional organ of the Left. On 29 August 1939, on the eve of World War II (1939–45), Le Petit Provençal called for support for the administrative commission of the Confédération générale du travail (General Confederation of Labor), which had condemned the Molotov–Ribbentrop Pact between the USSR and Germany.

On 18 June 1940 Le Petit Provencal and Le Petit Marseillais both published an appeal from General Charles de Gaulle in its entirety. Shortly after the Vichy government of Marshal Philippe Pétain had been established the newspaper published an article on 18 July 1940 that listed all that had been achieved by the French Third Republic since the 1875 constitution was established. It concluded with the words, "Vive la liberté! Vive la République!" American films were banned after the Germans arrived in Marseilles. Léon Bancal was jailed for an article Adieu á Mickey in Le Petit Provençal. The newspaper was closed in 1944.

== Sources ==
- Beudot, Françoise-Albane (1999). David Dellepiane: Peintre, affichiste, illustrateur. Editions Parenthèses. p. 150. ISBN 978-2-86364-098-2.
- Bergounioux, Alaine (October–December 1978). "Le néo-socialisme. Marcel Déat : réformisme traditionnel ou esprit des années trente". Revue Historique. 260 (2 (528)). Presses Universitaires de France: 389–412. JSTOR 40953188.
- Chambre des députés (1881). Annales: Débats parlementaires. Imprimerie du journal officiel.
- Collins, Ross F. (2001). "The Business of Journalism in Provincial France during World War I". Journalism History. 27 (3): 112–121. doi:10.1080/00947679.2001.12062578. ISSN 0094-7679. S2CID 141242021.
- "Godfried Velten (1831-1915), sénateur des Bouches-du-Rhône". GénéProvence (in French). 2014-09-08.
- Guillon, Jean-Marie (January–March 1992). "Le syndicalisme ouvrier varois de l'effondrement à l'apogée (1939-1944)". Le Mouvement social (158, Syndicalismes Sous Vichy). Editions l'Atelier on behalf of Association Le Mouvement Social: 37–58. doi:10.2307/3779326. JSTOR 3779326.
- Guiraud, Jean-Michel (January 1979). "La Vie Intellectuelle et Artistique a Marseille Au Temps du Maréchal Pétain". Revue d'histoire de la Deuxième Guerre mondiale, 29e Année. 29 (113, LA PROVENCE PENDANT LA GUERRE). Presses Universitaires de France: 63–90. JSTOR 25728974.
- Jolly, Jean (1977). "André, Joseph LEFÈVRE". Dictionnaire des parlementaires français de 1889 à 1940 (in French).
- Kitson, Simon (2014-05-01). Police and Politics in Marseille, 1936-1945. BRILL. ISBN 978-90-04-26523-3.
- Le Petit provençal.
- Olivesi, A. (January–March 1964). "Les Socialistes marseillais et le problème colonial". Le Mouvement social (in French) (46). Editions l'Atelier on behalf of Association Le Mouvement Social: 27–65. doi:10.2307/3777263. JSTOR 3777263.
