= Routes of the Olive Tree =

Greek nonprofit organization

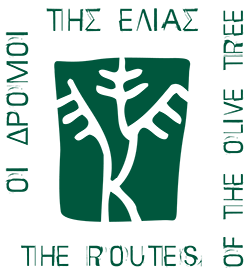

Routes of the Olive Tree is a non-governmental organization for research, documentation, protection and valorization of the civilization of the olive tree.

The Routes of the Olive Tree were inaugurated in 1998 as thematic cultural itineraries around the theme of the olive tree, to more than 25 countries in Europe and the Mediterranean. A cultural foundation of the same name was later founded in Greece.

Visits include exhibitions, local meetings with institutions and various events to promote the history of the olive tree internationally. The organization also conducts research regarding the history and cultivation of the olive tree.

== International recognition ==
The Routes of the Olive Tree were nominated "International Cultural Itinerary of intercultural dialogue & sustainable development" in 2003 by the Unesco in 2003 and "Great European Cultural Itinerary" in 2006 by the Council of Europe. They are under the auspices of the International Olive Council, the Hellenic Ministry of Culture and many other Greek and international institutions.

== Sources ==
- Marinella Katsilieri, "12 months with the olive tree", Cultural Organization "Routes of the Olive Tree", 2006, 55 pages, ISBN 978-960-89278-0-3
- Marinella Katsilieri, "In the routes of the olive tree and mediterranean", Cultural Organization "Routes of the Olive Tree", 2006, 120 pages, ISBN 978-960-89278-1-0
- Collective work, "Ode to Olive Tree", Academy of Athens, 2006, 342 pages, ISBN 978-960-404-054-4
