= Jardin botanique E.M. Heckel =

Municipal botanical garden in Marseille, France

Coordinates: 43.2598°N 5.3847°E

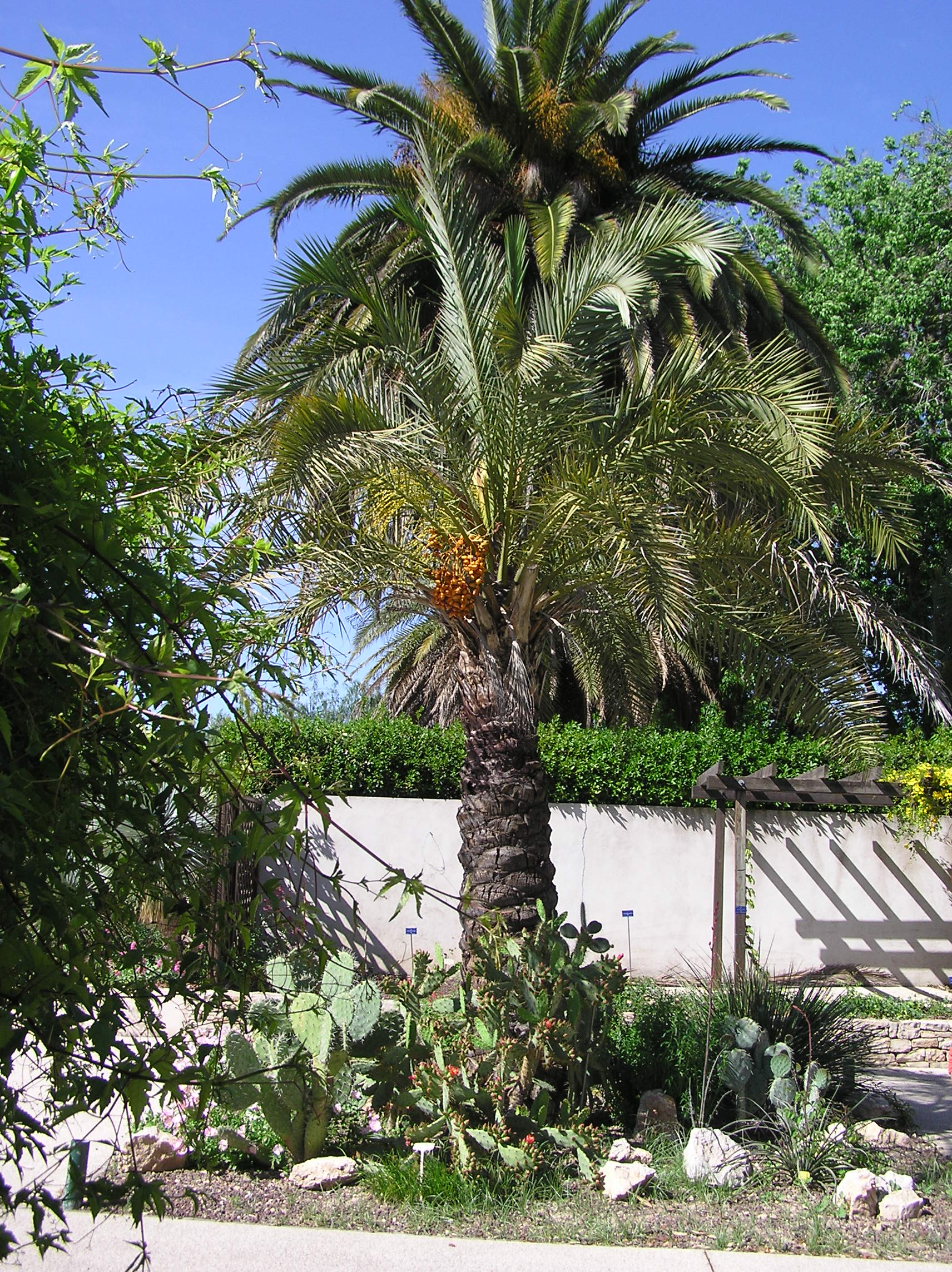
Jardin botanique E.M. Heckel

The Jardin botanique E.M. Heckel (12,000 m^{2}), also known as the Jardin botanique de Marseille and the Jardin botanique Borély de Marseille, is a municipal botanical garden in the Parc Borély at 48, Avenue Clot Bey, Marseille, Bouches-du-Rhône, Provence-Alpes-Côte d'Azur, France. It is open daily except Monday; an admission fee is charged.

== Overview ==
The garden is Marseille's fourth botanical garden. Its first was established by René of Anjou near the Abbaye Saint-Victor as the Jardin botanique des Chartreux. The second was inaugurated in 1802 by Joséphine de Beauharnais and directed by M. Gouffé de la Cour, but disappeared in 1856 to make way for a railway. The garden was then re-established in the Parc Borély, on the site of today's rose garden, but was quickly judged too small by its director, Dr. Édouard Marie Heckel, and in 1913 additional land was purchased next to the park, to which the garden was relocated and named in his honor.

Today the garden contains over 3,500 species, arranged in a garden of medicinal plants, a traditional Chinese garden donated by the city of Shanghai in 2004, palmetum (palm garden), garden vines, garden of succulents, Mediterranean garden, and a Japanese garden. Of particular interest is a greenhouse containing nearly 300 species of South African flora.

== See also ==
- List of botanical gardens in France
