= Heinrich August Ottokar Reichard =

German author and theatre director

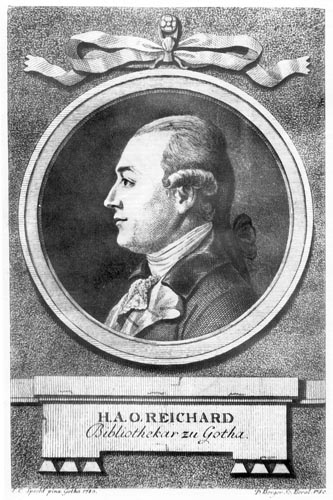
Portrait of H.A.O. Reichard

Heinrich August Ottokar Reichard (1751-1828) was a German author and theatre director. He was born in Gotha then part of the Holy Roman Empire.

== Works ==
- Handbuch für Reisende aus allen Ständen [Handbook for Travelers of all Ranks] (in German). Leipzig: Weygand. 1784.
- Guide des voyageurs en Europe (in French). Weimar: Bureau d'Industrie. 1793.
  - 2nd ed., 1802
  - 3rd ed., 1805 (3 vol.)
  - 5th ed., 1807
  - 6th ed., 1810
  - 7th ed., 1812
  - Guide des voyageurs en Europe (in French) (8th ed.). Paris. 1817. 1816-1818. + via HathiTrust
    - vol. 1: (part 1) Îles Britanniques, Danemarck, Suède et Russie; (part 2) Pays-Bas, Allemagne
    - vol. 2: France part 1, part 2
    - vol. 3: Suisse
    - vol. 4: (part 3) Italie, Hongrie, Turquie, Espagne et Portugal
  - 9th ed., 1819-1821
  - 11th ed., 1824

=== Translations of Reichard's work ===
- Reichard (1816), An Itinerary of France and Belgium, London: Samuel Leigh, "Translated from the French" + index

== Bibliography ==
- "Heinrich August Ottokar Reichard", Allgemeine Deutsche Biographie (in German), 1888
