= Le Petit Marseillais =

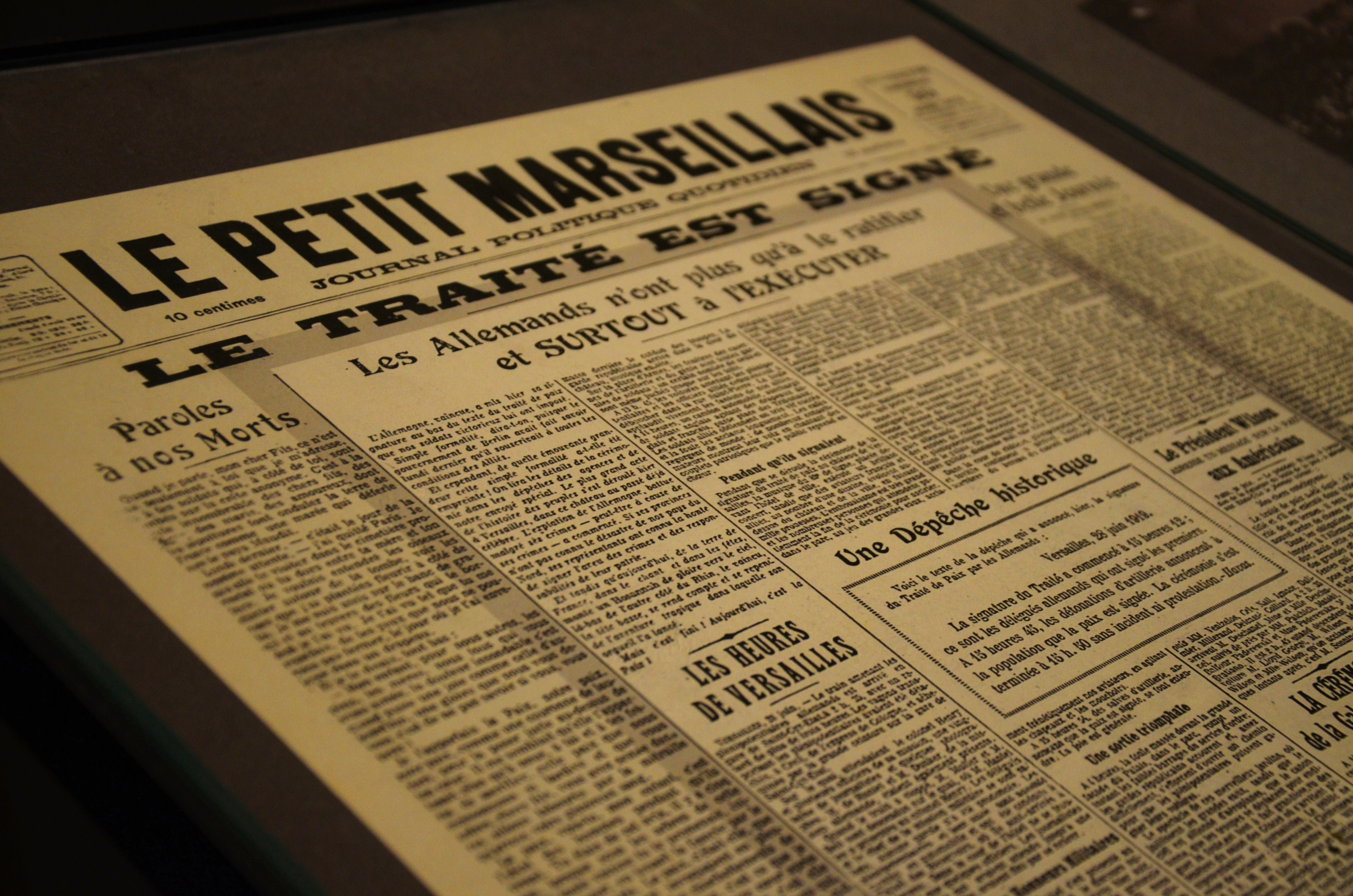
- Type: Daily
- Founder: Toussaint Samat
- Founded: 1868
- Ceased publication: 1944
- Language: French
- Headquarters: Marseille

Le Petit Marseillais was a daily regional newspaper published in Marseille between 1868 and 1944.

== History ==
The newspaper was founded in Marseille in 1868 by Toussaint Samat (1841–1916), a typographer. It was nicknamed the "one-sou newspaper" because of its price (5 centimes, or one sou), while other newspapers cost two sous (10 centimes). For a long time Le Petit Marseillais was the only one-sou daily newspaper in the region. In 1880 Le Petit Marseillais was the second largest provincial newspaper, behind Le Petit Lyonnais and ahead of La Dépêche. In the 1880s Félix Dubois was one of the newspaper's European correspondents, writing from Berlin and Vienna.

An 1887 directory of newspapers said Le Petit Marseillais was Republican, concerned with commerce and finance, with a circulation of 76,000. Competition became stronger with the appearance of the Le Radical, Le Petit Provencal and Le Soleil du Midi. In response, Le Petit Marseillais launched a six-page format on 16 May 1897.

In 1939 Le Petit Marseillais had a circulation of 150,000. The newspaper covered the south east of France, Corsica and North Africa. It was moderate and continued to call itself "Republican". Le Le Petit Marseillais controlled Le Petit Var, based in Toulon, a leftist "naval and general information paper" that also supported the July 1940 Révolution nationale of the Vichy government. The Radical-Socialist La Republique du Var, also based in Toulon, was also controlled by Le Petit Marseillais.

Albert Lejeune was managing editor of Le Petit Marseillais and of Lyon Républicain and Le Petit Niçois during World War II. He was guided by the German authorities, and his newspapers supported collaboration. After France was liberated, Lejeune was tried and on 22 October 1944 sentenced to death.

La Republique du Var reappeared after the war. Le Petit Var was replaced by the communist Le Petit Varois. Le Petit Marseillais was replaced by the communist La Marseillaise. Its premises were taken over by La Marseillaise and Midi Soir.

== Sources ==
- Beudot, Françoise-Albane (1999). David Dellepiane: Peintre, affichiste, illustrateur. Editions Parenthèses. p. 150. ISBN 978-2-86364-098-2.
- Evleth, Donna (1999). The Authorized Press in Vichy and German Occupied France, 1940-1944: A Bibliography. Greenwood Publishing Group. p. 21. ISBN 978-0-313-30784-3.
- Pike, David Wingeate (2011). France Divided: The French and the Civil War in Spain. Sussex Academic Press. ISBN 978-1-84519-490-1.
- Saint-Martin, Yves T. (1986). "Félix Dubois (1862-1945)" (PDF). Hommes et Destins. 7. Académie des sciences d'outre-mer. Archived from the original (PDF) on 2016-03-03.
- Sassoon, Donald (2012-06-28). The Culture of the Europeans (Text Only ed.). HarperCollins UK. p. 853. ISBN 978-0-00-740040-9.
- Sells (1887). Sells' Dictionary of the World's Press. p. 532.

Media related to Le Petit Marseillais at Wikimedia Commons
