= Hôtel de Ville, Marseille =

Town hall in Marseille, France

Hôtel de Ville
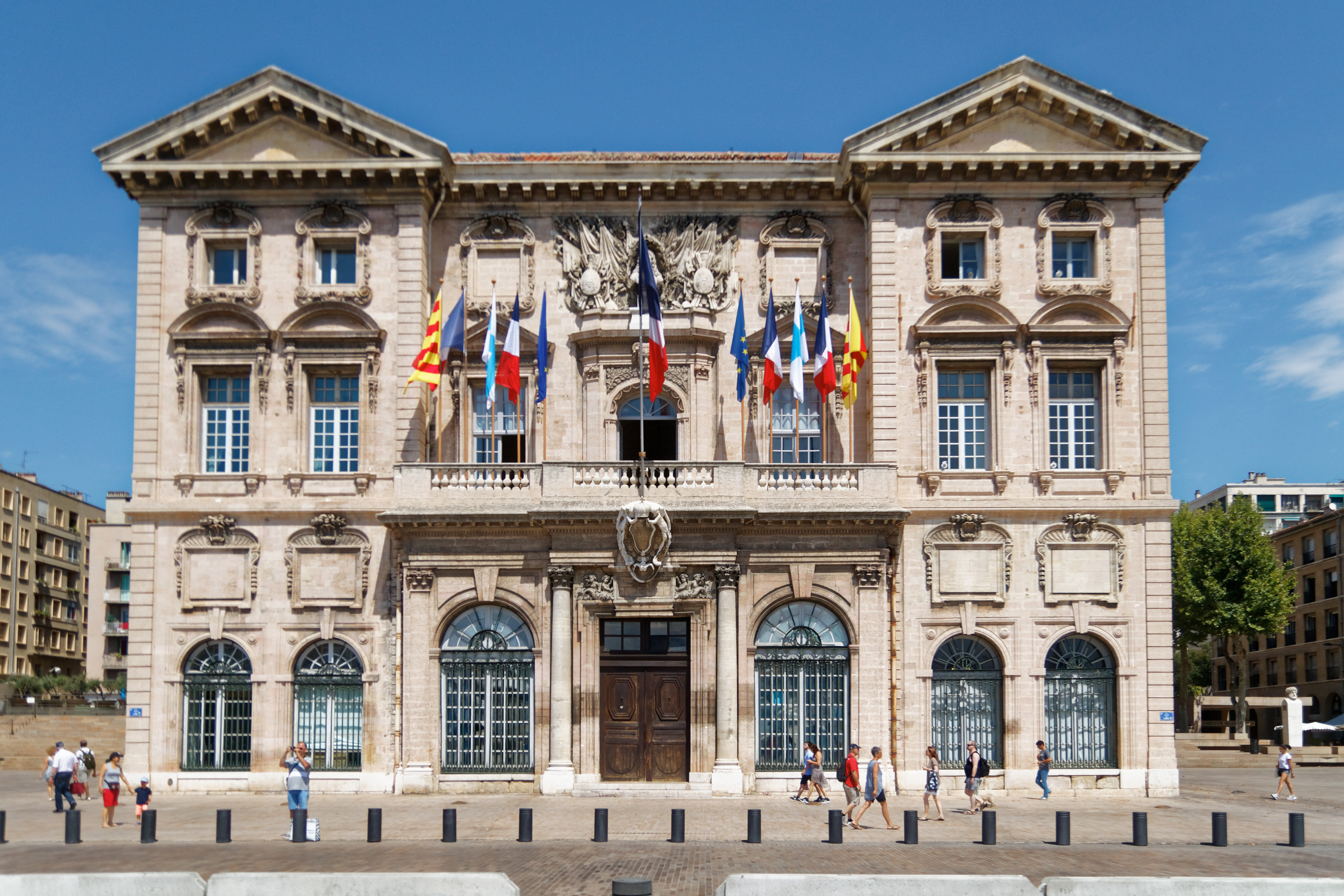
- Main frontage of the Hôtel de Ville in August 2018

General information
- Type: City hall
- Architectural style: Baroque style
- Location: Marseille, France
- Coordinates: 43.2963°N 5.3699°E
- Completed: 1673

Design and construction
- Architects: Gaspard Puget; Jean-Baptiste Méolans

Monument historique
- Official name: Hôtel de ville
- Type: Inscrit
- Designated: 1948
- Reference no.: PA00081354

The Hôtel de Ville (French pronunciation: [otɛl də vil], City Hall; Occitan: Ostal de Vila) is a historic building in Marseille, Bouches-du-Rhône, southern France, standing on Quai du Port. It was designated a monument historique by the French government in 1948.

== History ==
The original city hall was an ancient structure dating back at least to the mid-13th century. By the mid-17th century, it was dilapidated and, in September 1653, the first consul of Marseille, Gaspard de Villages, proposed that the city council should demolish it and erect a new building on the site.

The foundation stone for the new building was laid by the bishop, Étienne de Puget, on 25 October 1653. Construction was significantly disrupted by armed bands terrorising the country. The building was designed by Gaspard Puget and Jean-Baptiste Méolans in the Baroque style, built in ashlar stone and was completed in September 1673.

The design involved a symmetrical main frontage of seven bays facing Quai du Port, with the last two bays on either side slightly projected forward as pavilions. The central section of three bays featured a square-headed doorway with round headed windows on either side. The ground floor bays were flanked by Corinthian order columns and pilasters supporting an entablature. The first floor featured a French door, flanked by a pair of sash windows with triangular pediments, and there was a balcony with a stone balustrade in front. On the second floor, there was a bust of Louis XIV surrounded by military flags in the central bay, sculpted by Martin Grosfils. On either side there were panels surmounted by segmental pediments and acroteria. The last two bays on either side were fenestrated with round headed windows on the ground floor, tall square headed windows with segmental pediments on the first floor, and by small square windows with segmental pediments and acroteria on the second floor. Internally, the principal rooms included a bourse on the ground floor and three large municipal offices on the first floor.

In 1792, during the French Revolution, the fleurs-de-lis, which had formed part of the city's coat of arms designed by Pierre Puget and placed above the front door, were torn off by revolutionaries and replaced by a Phrygian cap as a mark of protest. They were restored some 30 years later during the reign of Louis XVIII.

On 23 March 1871, inspired by the establishment of the Paris Commune, a crowd of revolutionary guardsmen led by Gaston Crémieux stormed both the city hall and the prefecture, took the mayor and prefect prisoner and declared a similar commune in Marseille. On 4 April 1871, General Henry Espivent de la Villeboisnet entered the city with six to seven thousand regular soldiers and regained control.

In early 1943, during the Second World War, the Hôtel de Ville was one of only four buildings to survive when the German authorities decided to demolish most of the surrounding area.

A large extension, built almost completely underground, was constructed to a design by Franck Hammoutène and completed in 2006. The new facilities include a huge semi-circular council chamber, committee rooms and exhibition space. The project also created a new square, the Place Villeneuve-Bargemon, on the surface. The project was awarded the Prix de l'Équerre d'Argent (the Silver T-square Prize) in 2006.

During the student protests in October 2026, the town hall was attacked by protesters, who vandalised the interior before being dispersed.
