= Fasti Triumphales =

List of Roman generals honoured with a triumph

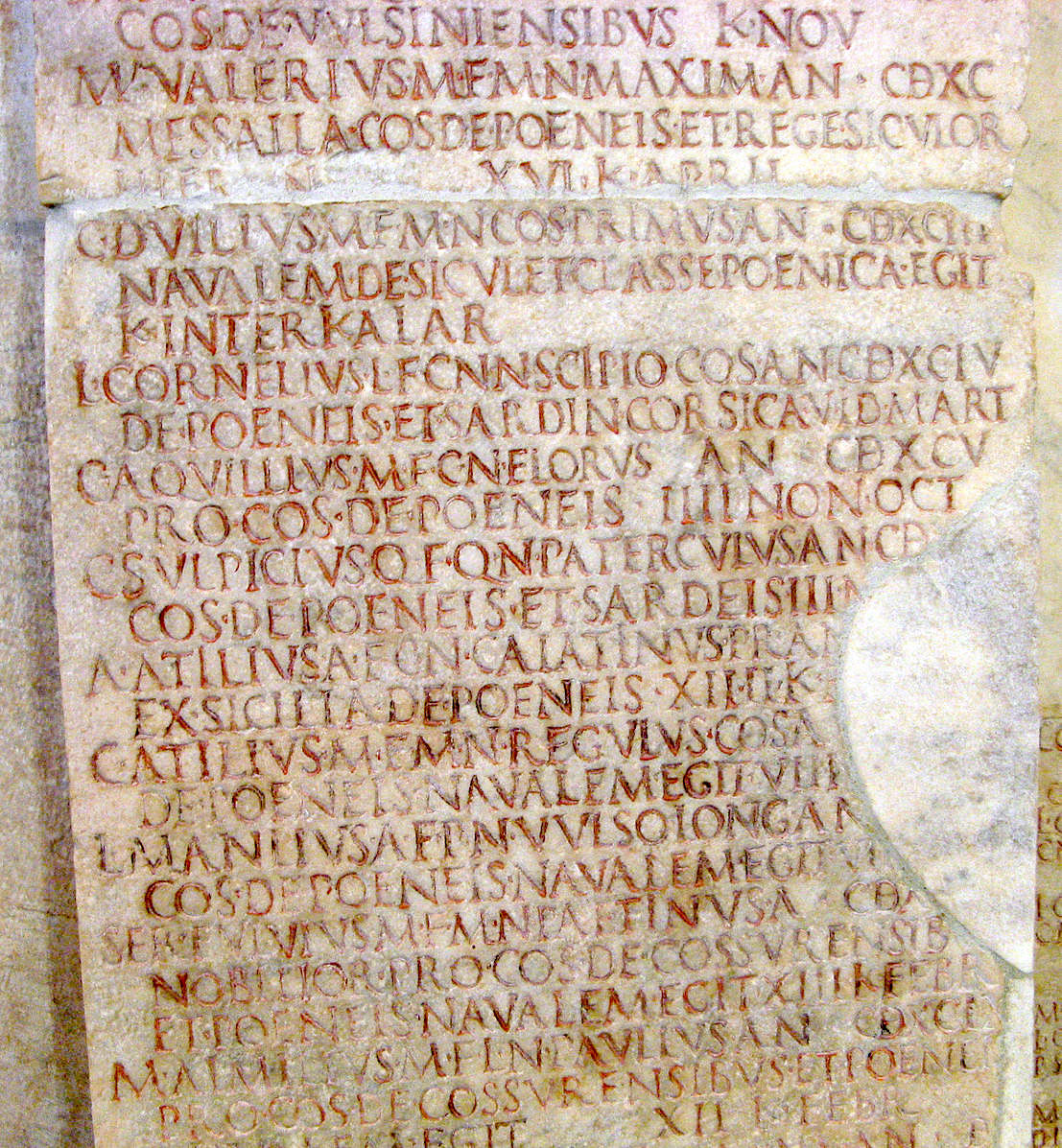
A portion of the Fasti Triumphales, listing the triumphators of the First Punic War, starting with Manius Valerius Messalla in 262 BC.

The Acta Triumphorum or Triumphalia, better known as the Fasti Triumphales, or Triumphal Fasti, (Note: As with the names of many Roman artifacts and institutions, the capitalization of Fasti Triumphales varies from source to source; sometimes both words are capitalized, sometimes the first word, and sometimes neither. In this article, Fasti Triumphales and its alternatives are treated as proper names, while "fasti" by itself is taken as a common noun.) is a calendar of Roman magistrates honoured with a celebratory procession known as a triumphus, or triumph, in recognition of an important military victory, from the earliest period down to 19 BC. Together with the related Fasti Capitolini and other, similar inscriptions found at Rome and elsewhere, they form part of a chronology referred to by various names, including the Fasti Annales or Historici, Fasti Consulares, or Consular Fasti, and frequently just the fasti.

The Triumphales were originally engraved on marble tablets, which decorated one of the structures in the Roman forum. They were discovered in a fragmentary state as the portion of the forum where they were located was being cleared to provide building material for St. Peter's Basilica in 1546. Recognized by scholars as an important source of information on Roman history, they were taken to the Palazzo dei Conservatori on the nearby Capitoline Hill, and reconstructed. As part of the collection of the Capitoline Museums, the Fasti Triumphales are one of the most important sources for Roman chronology.

== History ==
The Fasti Triumphales were probably engraved in 18 BC, in order to adorn the Arch of Augustus, which had recently been constructed in the forum. They were contemporary with the Fasti Capitolini, or Capitoline Fasti, a list of the chief magistrates at Rome from at least the beginning of the Republic down to the same period as the Triumphales. Alternately, they may have been built into the wall of the Regia, an ancient building that was reconstructed in 36 BC, which was the official residence of the Pontifex Maximus, and the site where the Annales Maximi, official records of Roman history from at least the fifth century BC down to the second, were stored. The Fasti Capitolini were most likely on the west and south sides of the Regia, and the Triumphales may have occupied part of the south wall.

Both lists were discovered by the scholars Onofrio Panvinio and Pirro Ligorio, as they observed the demolition of ancient structures in the forum by a local company of quarrymen working to obtain building material for St. Peter's Basilica. Some of the stone would be reused in the structure, while other portions would be used to make cement. Recognizing the value of the inscriptions, the two ordered the sinking of new trenches, in hopes of recovering additional fragments. In all, they rescued thirty pieces of the Fasti Capitolini, and twenty-six of the Triumphales, which they brought to the Palazzo dei Conservatori on the instructions of Cardinal Alessandro Farnese. The lists were then reconstructed by Ligorio and Michelangelo.

With additional excavations, the number of fragments of the Triumphales has grown to thirty-eight. The known portions of the fasti were published in the first volume of the Corpus Inscriptionum Latinarum in 1863, and together with the Capitolini, they form part of the collection of the Capitoline Museums, where they are displayed in the Sala dei Fasti, the Salon of the Fasti.

== Contents ==
The Triumphal Fasti list all of the magistrates who celebrated a triumph from the legendary founding of the city by Romulus down to 19 BC. The earliest entries record triumphs by the Roman kings. The Fasti also include entries for magistrates who received an ovation, or "lesser triumph". They were evidently carved on four pilasters, each eleven feet tall. The first covered the years down to 302 BC, the second to 222, the third to 129, and the last to the end.

Each entry gives the full name of the magistrate who triumphed, beginning with his praenomen (normally abbreviated), nomen gentilicium, filiation, and cognomina (if any). Following these names are the magistracy or promagistracy held, the names of the defeated enemies or conquered territories, and the date that the triumph was celebrated. Roman numerals indicate those individuals who held the magistracy in question multiple times, or who received multiple triumphs. (Note: These notations are usually referred to as iterations.) Each entry also has the year of the triumph indicated in the right margin. (Note: Because the rest of the entry is written around the year, transcriptions of the Triumphales may give the impression that the year occurs in random locations in each entry.) The years given in the Triumphales are one year earlier than those of the Varronian chronology.

There are several gaps in the Fasti Triumphales. The first occurs following the second triumph attributed to Romulus, and presumably would have included further triumphs attributed to Romulus, or to Tullus Hostilius, the third King of Rome. Major gaps occur from 437 to 369 BC, from 291 to 282, 222 to 197, 187 to 178, 81 to 62, and 54 to 45. The missing sections include three of the triumphs of Camillus, the entire period of the Second Punic War, and all but the last triumph celebrated by Caesar. Shorter gaps occur from 502 to 496, 494 to 486, 329 to 326, 263 to 260, 191 to 189, 104 to 98, and 34 to 29 BC.

== Transcription ==
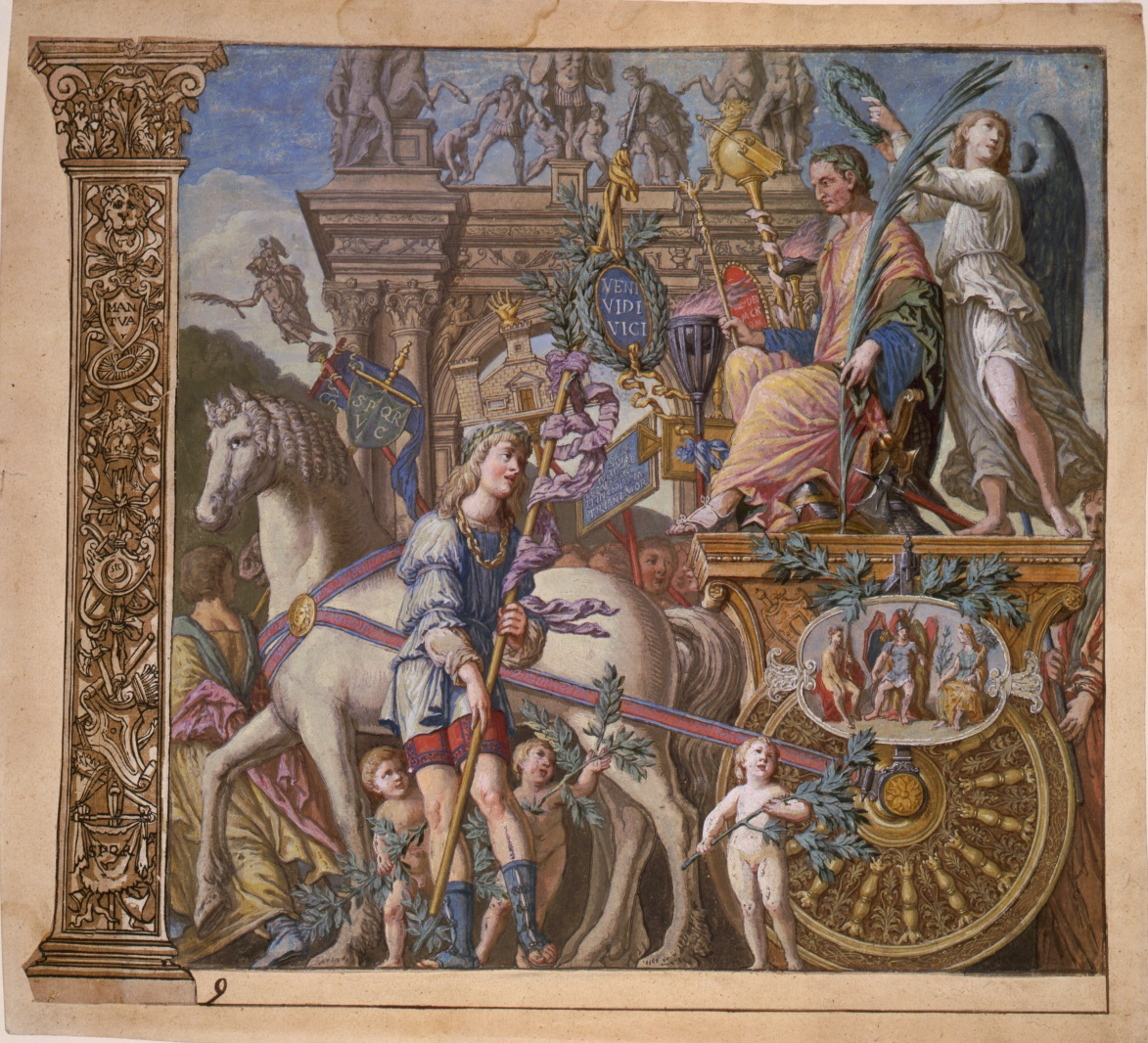
Andrea Andreani, Triumphus Caesaris (The Triumph of Caesar), plate 9 (1598/99).

The following table lists the entries from the surviving portions of the Fasti Triumphales. The columns on the left give the years according to the Varronian chronology, which begins one year earlier than the years given in the Triumphales. (Note: The Triumphales and Capitolini both use the era of Cato, who placed the founding of the city one year later than Varro.) The years AUC from the original inscription are given in the column on the right. (Note: Note that Roman numerals were used more flexibly by the Romans than is typical today, and not always consistently: in the Fasti Triumphales, CDXXXXI, 441, occurs immediately before CDXLII, 442. "Double subtractives" such as CXXCVI, 186, and CDXIIX, 418, are regularly encountered.)

=== Reading the fasti ===
Portions of names and text in square brackets have been interpolated. Periods (full stops) have been supplied for abbreviations. An em-dash is used for missing or unknown filiations or other abbreviated praenomina. Other missing text is indicated with an ellipsis in brackets, [...]. This table uses modern conventions for distinguishing between I and J, and between U and V. Otherwise, the names and notes are given as spelled in the fasti. Archaic Roman spellings, such as Aimilius for Aemilius, have been preserved. A guide to reading Roman dates and a list of the peoples and places referred to in the Fasti follow the table.

==== Magistracies ====
- cos. = consul
- pro cos. = proconsul
- pr. = praetor
- pro pr. = propraetor
- dict. = dictator
- IIIvir r. p. c. = triumvir rei publicae constituendae, triumvir to restore the Republic
- imp. = imperator, originally a title bestowed on a victorious general by his soldiers, later assumed as part of the style of the emperors

==== Praenomina ====
The following praenomina appear in the Fasti Triumphales. All but a few were regularly abbreviated. A few uncommon praenomina found in the Fasti Capitolini do not appear in the Fasti Triumphales.

- A. = Aulus
- Agrippa (not abbreviated)
- Ancus (not abbreviated)
- Ap. = Appius
- C. = Gaius
- Cn. = Gnaeus
- K. = Kaeso or Caeso
- L. = Lucius
- M. = Marcus
- M'. = Manius
- N. = Numerius
- P. = Publius
- Q. = Quintus
- Ser. = Servius
- Sex. = Sextus
- Sp. = Spurius
- T. = Titus
- Ti. = Tiberius
- Volusus (not abbreviated)

=== First tablet ===
Year BC	Year AUC	Entry	Annum
753	1	Romulus Martis f. rex de Caenensibus K. Mar[t.]	ann. [I]
753	1	[Ro]m[ulus] Marti[s f.] rex II [de Antemnatibus ...]	a[nn. I]
—	—	[Ancus Marcius — f. — n. rex de Sabi]neis et [Veientibus ...]	
59–	15–	L. [T]arquinius Damarati f. Priscus rex de Latineis K. Quinct.	an. CLV[...]
588	166	L. Tarquinius Damarati f. Priscus rex de Etrusceis [K. A]pr.	an. CLXV
585	169	L. Tarquinius Damarati f. Priscus rex III de Sabineis Idib. Sext.	ann. CLXVIII
571	183	Ser. Tullius rex de Etruscis vi. K. Dec.	anno CXXCII
567	187	Ser. Tullius rex II de Etrusc. viii. K. Jun.	a. CXXCVI
56–	18–	Ser. Tullius rex III de Etrusceis iiii. Non. [...]	ann. CXXC[...]
—	—	L. Tarq[uinius Prisci f.] Dama[rati n. Superbus rex de Volsceis ...]	[ann. ...]
—	—	L. Tarqui[nius Prisci f. Damarati n.] Super[bus rex II de Sabineis ...]	[a. ...]
509	245	P. Valer[ius Volusi f. — n. Poplicola] cos. d[e Veientib. et Tarquiniensib. K. Mart.]	[a. CCXLIV]
505	249	M. Valer[ius Volusi f. — n. Volusus] cos. [de Sabineis ...]	[a. CCXLVIII]
505	249	P. Postu[mius Q. f. — n. Tubertus] cos. [de Sabineis ...]	[ann. CCXLVIII]
504	250	P. Valeriu[s Volusi f. — n.] Poblicol[a II cos. IIII de Sa]bine[is] et Veient[ibus ... Non]as Mai.	[ann. CCXLIX]
503	251	P. Postumiu[s Q. f. — n. Tubert]us cos. II o[vans de Sabinei]s iii. Non. Apr.	ann. CCL
503	251	Agrippa M[enenius C. f. — n. Lan]atus cos. de [Sabineis prid]ie Non. Apr.	ann. CCL
502	252	Sp. Cassiu[s — f. — n. Vicellinu]s cos. d[e Sabineis]	ann. CCLI
496	258	A. Postu[mius P. f. — n. Albus] Regil[lensis dict. de Latineis ...]	[ann. CCLVII]
494	260	M'. Vale[rius Volusi f. — n. Maxim.] dic[t. de Sabineis et Medullineis]	[ann. CCLIX]
486	268	[Sp. Cassius — f. — n. Vicellinus II cos. III de Volsceis Herniceis ...] K. Jun.	[ann CCLXVII]
475	279	[P. Valerius P. f. Volusi n. Poplic]ola [cos. de Veientibus Sabi]neisque K. Mai.	an. CCLXXIIX
474	280	[A. Manlius Cn. f. P. n. Vulso co]s. [ovans de Veientibus I]dibus Mart.	ann. CCLXXIX
468	286	[T. Quinctius L. f. L. n. Capitolin. Barba]tus [cos. II de Volsceis Antiatibus ...]	a. CCXX[CV]
462	292	[L. Lucretius T. f. T. n. Tricipitinus cos. de Aequeis et Vo]ls[ceis ...]	[ann. CCXCI]
462	292	[T. Veturius T. f. — n.] Gemin[us Cicurin. cos. ovans de Aequ]eis et [Volsceis ...]	[an. CCXCI]
459	295	[Q. Fabius M. f. K. n. Vibulanus cos. III de Ae]queis e[t Volsceis ... No]n. Mai.	[an. CCXCIV]
459	295	[L. Cornelius Ser. f. P. n.] M[alugines. Uriti]nus cos. de Volsceis [A]ntiatib. iv. Id. Mai.	an. CCXCIV
458	296	[L. Quin]ctius L. f. L. n. Cincin[n]atus [dict.] de Aequeis Idibus Septembr.	an. CCXCV
449	305	[L. Valer]ius P. f. P. n. Poplicola Potit. [cos.] de Aequeis Idibus Sextil.	an. CCCIV
449	305	[M. Hora]tius M. f. L. n. Barbatus [cos. de] Sabin[eis] VII K. Septembr.	ann. CCCIV
443	311	[M. Gega]nius M. [f. — n. Mace]rinus [cos. II] de V[olsceis N]onis Sep.	ann. CCCX
437	317	[M. Valerius M. f. M. n. Lactuca Maxi]mus [cos. de ...]us Idib. Sex[t.]	an. CCCXVI
369	385	[M. Furius L. f. Sp. n. Camillus IV dict. V de Galleis ...] Nov.	[ann. CCCXXCVI]
361	393	[T. Quinctius — f. — n. Pennus Capitol. Crispinus dict de Galleis ...]nalibus	a. CCCXCII
361	393	[C. Sulpicius M. f. Q. n. Peticus cos. II de Herniceis ... Ma]rt.	an. CCCXCII
360	394	[C. Poetelius C. f. Q. n. Libo Visolus] cos. de Galleis et Tiburtibus iv. K. [S]ext.	an. CCCXCIII
360	394	M. Fabius N. f. M. n. Ambustus cos. ovans de Herniceis Nonis Sept.	an. CCCXCIII
358	396	C. Sulpicius M. f. Q. n. Peticus II dict. de Galleis Nonis Mai.	ann. CCCXCV
358	396	C. Plautius P. f. P. n. Proculus cos. de Herniceis Idibus Mai.	ann. CCCXCV
357	397	C. Marcius L. f. C. n. Rutilus cos. de Privernatibus K. Jun.	ann. CCCXCVI
356	398	C. Marcius L. f. C. n. Rutilus dict. de Tusceis pridie Non. Mai.	an. CCCXCVII
354	400	M. Fabius N. f. M. n. Ambustus II [cos. I]II de Tiburtibus III Non. Jun.	ann. CCCXCIX
350	404	[M. Popi]llius M. f. C. n. Laenas cos. III [de G]alleis Quirinalibus	an. CDIII
346	408	[M. Va]lerius M. f. M. n. Corvus cos. II [de] Antiatibus Volsceis Satricaneisq. K. Febr.	ann. CDVII
343	411	[M. Vale]rius M. f. M. n. Corvus II [cos.] III de Samnitibus x. K. Oct.	ann. CDX
340	414	[T.] Manlius L. f. A. n. Imperiossus Torquat. cos. III de Latineis Campaneis Sidicineis [A]urunceis xv. K. Junias	a. CDXIII
339	415	[Q. P]ublilius Q. f. Q. n. Philo cos. de Latineis Idibus Januar.	anno CDXIV
338	416	L. Furius Sp. f. M. n. Camillus cos. de Pedaneis et Tiburtibus iiii. K. Oct.	ann. CDXV
338	416	C. Maenius P. f. P. n. cos. de Antiatibus Lavinieis Veliterneis pridie K. Oct.	an. CDXV
335	419	M. Valerius M. f. M. n. Corvus III cos. IV de Caleneis Idibus Mart.	an. CDXIIX
329	425	[L.] Aimilius L. f. L. n. Mamercin. Privernas cos. II de Privernatib. K. Mart.	ann. CDXXIV
329	425	C. Plautius P. f. P. n. Decianus cos. de Privernatibus K. Mart.	an. CDXXIV
326	428	Q. Publilius Q. f. Q. n. Philo II primus pro cos. de Samnitibus Palaeopolitaneis K. Mai.	ann. CDXXVII
324	430	L. Papirius Sp. f. L. n. Cursor dict. de Samnitibus iii. Non. Mart.	ann. CDXXIX
322	432	Q. Fabius M. f. N. n. Maximus Rullian. cos. de Samnitibus et Apuleis xii. K. Mart.	an. CDXXXI
319	435	L. Papirius Sp. f. L. n. Cursor II cos. III de Samnitibus x. K. Septembr.	an. CDXXXIV
314	440	C. Sulpicius Ser. f. Q. n. Longus cos. III de Samnitibus K. Quint.	anno CDXXXIX
312	442	M. Valerius M. f. M. n. Maximus cos. de Samnitibus Soraneisq. Idib. Sext.	ann. CDXXXXI
311	443	C. Junius C. f. C. n. Bubulcus Brutus cos. III de Samnitibus Nonis Sext.	an. CDXLII
311	443	Q. Aemilius Q. f. L. n. Barbula cos. II de Etrusceis Idibus Sext.	ann. CDXLII
309	445	L. Papirius Sp. f. L. n. Cursor III dict. II de Samnitibus Idibus Oct.	ann. CDXLIV
309	445	Q. Fabius M. f. N. n. Maximus Rullianus II pro cos. de Etrusceis Idibus Nov.	an. CDXLIV
306	448	Q. Marcius Q. f. Q. n. Tremulus cos. de Anagneis Herniceisq. pridie K. Quint.	an. CDXLVII
305	449	M. Fulvius L. f. L. n. Curvus Paetinus cos. de Samnitibus iii. Non. Oct.	ann. CDXLIIX
304	450	P. Sempronius P. f. C. n. Sophus cos. de Aequeis vii. K. Oct.	ann. CDXLIX
304	450	P. Sulpicius Ser. f. P. n. Saverrio cos. de Samnitibus iiii. K. Nov.	an. CDXLIX
302	452	C. Junius C. f. C. n. Bubulcus Brutus II dict. de Aequeis iii. K. Sext.	an. CDLI

=== Second tablet ===
Year BC	Year AUC	Entry	Annum
301	453	M. Valer[i]us M. f. M. n. Cor[vus] dict. II [de] Etrusceis et [Ma]rseis x. K. De[cem]br.	an. CDLII
299	455	M. Fulvius Cn. f. Cn. n. Paetinus cos. de Samnitibus Nequinatibusque vii. K. Oct.	ann. CD[LIV]
298	456	Cn. Fulvius Cn. f. Cn. n. Maxim. Centumalus cos. de Samnitibus Etrusceisque Idibus Nov.	an. CDLV
295	459	Q. Fabius M. f. N. n. Maximus Rullianus III cos. V de Samnitibus et Etrusceis Galleis prid. Non. Sept.	an. CDLIIX
294	460	L. Postumius L. f. Sp. n. Megell. cos. II de Samnitib. et Etruscis vi. K. Apr.	an. CDLIX
294	460	M. Atilius M. f. M. n. Regulus cos. de Volsonibus et Samnitib. v. K. Apr.	a. CDLIX
293	461	Sp. Carvilius C. f. C. n. Maximus cos. de Samnitibus Idibus Jan.	a. CDLX
293	461	[L. Papiriu]s L. f. Sp. n. Cursor [cos. de Sam]nitibus Idibus Febr.	an. CDLX
291	463	[Q. Fabius Q. f. M. n. M]aximus [Gurges pro cos. de Samnitibus ...] K. Sext.	an. CDLXII
282	472	[C. Fabricius C. f. C. n. Luscinus cos. de Samnitibus Lucaneis Brutti]eisque iii. Non. Mart.	an. CDLXXI
281	473	[Q. Mar]cius Q. f. Q. n. Philippus [cos. d]e Etrusceis K. Apr.	an. CDLXXII
280	474	[Ti. Coru]ncanius Ti. f. Ti. n. cos. [de V]ulsiniensibus et Vulcientib. K. Febr.	an. CDLXXIII
280	474	[L. Ai]milius Q. f. Q. n. Barbula pro cos. de Tarentineis Samnitibus et Sallentineis vi. Idus Quint.	an. CDLXXIII
278	476	C. Fabricius C. f. C. n. Luscinus II cos. II de Lucaneis Bruttieis Tarentin. Samnitibus Idibus Decembr.	an. CDLXXV
277	477	C. Junius C. f. C. n. Brutus Bubulc. cos. II de Lucaneis et Bruttieis Non. Jan.	an. CDLXXVI
276	478	Q. Fabius Q. f. M. n. Maximus Gurges II de Samnitibus Lucaneis Bruttieis Quirinalibus	an. CDLXXVII
275	479	M'. Curius M'. f. M'. n. Dentatus IV [cos. II de Sa]mnitib. et rege Pyrrho [... F]ebr.	a. CDLXXIIX
275	479	[L. Cornelius] Ti. f. Ser. n. Lentulus [Caudin. c]os. de Samnitibus et [Lucaneis] K. Mart.	a. CDLXXXIX
273	481	[C. Claudius M.] f. C. n. Canina [cos. II de Luca]neis Samnitibus [Bruttieisque] Quirinalibus	an. CDXXXC
272	482	[Sp. Carvilius C. f. C. n. Ma]ximus II [cos. II de Samnitib. Lucaneis Bruttieis] Tarentin[eis]que Non[is ...]	an. CD[XXCI]
272	482	L. Papiruius L. f. [Sp. n.] Cursor I[I] cos. II de Ta[ren]tineis L[ucaneis Samnitib.] Bruttieis[que] I[...]	an. CDXXCI
270	484	[Cn.] Cornel[ius P. f. Cn. n. Blasio cos.] de Regi[neis ...]	[an. CDXXCIII]
268	486	[P. Semp]ronius P. f. P. [n. Sophus cos.] de Peicentibus [...]	[an. CDXXCV]
268	486	Ap. Claudius Ap. f. C. [n. Russus] cos. de Peicen[tibus ...]	an. CDXXCV
267	487	M. Atilius M. f. L. n. Re[gu]lus cos. de Sallentineis viii. [K. Febr.]	a[n. CDXXCVI]
267	487	L. Julius L. f. L. n. Libo cos. de Sallentineis viii. K. Febr.	an. C[DXXCVI]
266	488	D. Junius D. f. D. n. Pera cos. de Sassinatibus v. K. Octobr.	an. CDXXCVII
266	488	N. Fabius C. f. M. n. Pictor cos. de Sassinatibus iii. Non. Oct.	an. CDXXCVII
266	488	N. Fabius C. f. M. n. Pictor II cos. de Sallentineis Messapieisque K. Febr.	an. CDXXCVII
266	488	D. Junius D. f. D. n. Pera II cos. de Sallentineis Messapieisq. Non. Febr.	an. CDXXCVII
264	490	M. Fulvius Q. f. M. n. Flaccus cos. de Vulsiniensibus K. Nov.	an. CDXXCIX
263	491	M'. Valerius M. f. M. n. Maxim. Messalla cos. de Poeneis et rege Siculor. Hierone xvi. K. April.	an. CDXC
260	494	C. Duilius M. f. M. n. cos. primus navalem de Sicul. et classe Poenica egit K. Interkalar.	an. CDXCIII
259	495	L. Cornelius L. f. Cn. n. Scipio cos. de Poenis et Sardin. Corsica v. Id. Mart.	an. CDXCIV
258	496	C. Aquillius M. f. C. n. Florus pro cos. de Poeneis iiii. Non. Oct.	an. CDXCV
258	496	C. Sulpicius Q. f. Q. n. Paterculus cos. de Poeneis et Sardeis iii. N[on. Oct.]	an. CDX[CV]
257	497	A. Atilius A. f. C. n. Caiatinus pr. ex Sicilia de Poeneis xiiii. K. F[ebr.]	an. [CDXCVI]
257	497	C. Atilius M. f. M. n. Regulus cos. de Poeneis navalem egit viii. [...]	a. [CDXCVI]
256	498	L. Manlius A. f. P. n. Vulso Long. cos. de Poeneis navalem egit viii. [...]	an. [CDXCVII]
254	500	Ser. Fulvius M. f. M. n. Paetinus Nobilior pro cos. de Cossurensibus et Poeneis navalem egit xiii. K. Febr.	a. CDX[CIX]
254	500	M. Aimilius M. f. L. n. Paullus pro cos. de Cossurensibus et Poenis navalem egit xii. K. Febr.	an. CDXCIX
253	501	Cn. Cornelius L. f. Cn. n. Scipio Asina pro cos. de Poeneis x. K. April.	an. D
253	501	C. Sempronius Ti. f. Ti. n. Blaesus cos. de Poeneis K. April.	an. D
252	502	C. Aurelius L. f. C. n. Cotta cos. de Poeneis et Siculeis Idibus April.	an. DI
250	504	L. Caecilius L. f. C. n. Metellus pro cos. de Poeneis vii. Idus Septemb.	a. DII[I]
241	513	C. Lutatius C. f. C. n. Catulus pro cos. de Poeneis ex Sicilia navale. egit iiii. Nonas Octobr.	a. DXII
241	513	Q. Valerius Q. f. P. n. Falto pro pr. ex Sicilia navalem egit prid. Non. Oct.	a. DXII
241	513	Q. Lutatius C. f. C. n. Cerco cos. de Falisceis K. Mart.	an. DXII
241	513	A. Manlius T. f. T. n. Torquatus Atticus cos. II de Falisceis iv. Non. Ma[rt.]	ann. DXII
236	518	P. Cornelius L. f. Ti. n. Lentulus Caudinus cos. de Ligurib. Idib. Inter[k.]	an. DXV[II]
235	519	T. Manlius T. f. T. n. Torquatus cos. de Sardeis vi. Idus Mart.	an. DXV[III]
234	520	Sp. Carvilius Sp. f. C. n. Maximus cos. de Sardeis K. April.	an. D[XIX]
233	521	Q. Fabius Q. f. Q. n. Maximus Verrucossus cos. de Liguribus K. Febr.	anno DXX
233	521	M'. Pomponius M'. f. M'. n. Matho cos. de Sardeis Idibus Mart.	ann. DX[X]
231	523	C. Papirius C. f. L. n. Maso cos. de Corseis primus in monte Albano iii. Non. Mart.	ann. DXXII
228	526	Cn. Fulvius Cn. f. Cn. n. Centumalus pro cos. ex Illurieis naval. egit x. K. Quint.	a. DXXV
225	529	L. Aimilius Q. f. Cn. n. Papus cos. de Galleis iii. Nonas Mart.	an. DXXIIX
223	531	C. Flaminius C. f. L. n. cos. de Galleis vi. id. Mart.	anno DXXX
223	531	P. Furius Sp. f. M. n. Philus cos. de Galleis et Liguribus iiii. Idus Mar[t.]	anno DXXX
222	532	M. Claudius M. f. M. n. Marcellus an. cos. de Galleis Insubribus et Germ[an.] K. Mart. isque spolia opima rettu[lit] duce hostium Virdomaro ad Clastid[ium interfecto]	an. DXX[XI]

=== Third tablet ===
Year BC	Year AUC	Entry	Annum
197	557	Q. Minucius C. f. C. n. Rufus cos. de G[alleis Liguribusque in monte] Alban[o ...]	ann. DLVI
196	558	[M.] Claudiu[s M. f. M. n.] Marcellus [cos.] de Gal[leis Ins]ubrib. iv. Non. M[art.]	a. DLV[II]
196	558	[Cn. Co]rneli[us — f. —] n. Blasio [quo]i qu[od Hispan. cit]eri[or. extra o]rdinem [obtinuerat permissum est] ovans [de Celtibereis ...]	a. [DLVII]
195	559	M. Helv[ius — f. — n. pro cos. ovans de Celtibereis ...]	[anno DLIIX]
195	559	Q. M[inucius Q. f. L. n. Thermus] pr[o cos. ex Hispan. ulterior. ...]	[an. DLIIX]
194	560	M. Por[cius M. f. Cato pro cos.] ex Hi[spania citeriore ...]	[an. DLIX]
194	560	[T.] Quinc[tius T. f. L. n. Flamininus] pro cos. [ex Macedonia et rege] Philippo [per trid. ...]	[an. DLIX]
191	563	M. Fulvius M. [f. Ser. n. Nobilior] pro cos. ov[ans ex Hispania ulteriore] xv. K. Jan.	[an. DLXII]
191	563	[P. Co]rne[lius Cn. f. L. n. Scipio Nasica cos. de Galleis Boieis ...]	[an. DLXII]
189	565	[L. Aimilius M. f. — n. Regillus pro] pr. ex Asia de [reg. Antiocho naval.] egit K. Febr.	[an. DLXIV]
189	565	L. Cornelius P. f. L. n. S[cipio Asiaticus] pro cos. ex Asia de r[ege Antiocho pr. K. Mart.]	[an. DLXIV]
188	566	[Q.] Fabius Q. f. Q. n. Labe[o pr. ex] Asia de rege Antioch[o navalem egit N]on. Febr.	[an. DLXV]
187	567	[M. Fu]lvius M. f. Ser. n. Nobil[ior II pro cos. de] Aetoleis et Ceph[allenia x. K. Jan.	[an. DLXVI]
187	567	[Cn. Manlius Cn.] f. L. n. Vul[so pro cos. ex Asia de Galleis iii. Non. Mart.]	[an. DLXVI]
178	576	[Ti. Sempronius P. f. T]i. n. Grac[chus pro cos. de Celti]bereis Hispaneisq. iii. Non. F[ebr.]	a. DLX[XV]
178	576	[L. Postumius A. f.] A. n. Albinus pro [cos. ex] Lu[sita]nia Hispaniaq. pr. Non. Fe[br.]	an. DLXXV
177	577	[C. C]laudius [Ap. f. P.] n. Pulcher cos. de Histre[is et] Liguribus K. Interk.	ann. DLXX[VI]
175	579	[T]i. Sempron[ius P. f.] Ti. n. Gracchus II pro co[s. ex Sa]rdinia Termi[nalib.]	a. DLX[XIIX]
175	579	[M.] Titin[ius — f.] M. n. Curvus pr[o cos. ex Hispania citeriore ...]	[an. DLXXIIX]
175	579	[M. Aimiliu]s M. f. [M.] n. Lepidups cos. II de Lig]uribus iii. Id[us Mart.]	[a. DLXXIIX]
175	579	[P. Muci]us Q. f. P. n. [Sc]aevula [cos. de Li]guribus iiii. Id[us Mart.]	[ann. DLXXIIX]
174	580	[Ap. Claudius C. f. Ap.] n. Cento pro [cos.] ovan[s ex His]pania [Ce]ltiberia [K. Mart.]	a. [DLXXIX]
172	582	[C. Ci]cer[eius — f. qui s]crib. [fuera]t pro pr. ex Corsica in monte Albano K. Oct.	an. D[XXCI]
167	587	L. Aimilius L. f. M. n. Paullus II pro cos. ex Macedon. et rege Perse per triduum IIII II[I] pridie K. Decem.	a. DXXC[VI]
167	587	[Cn. Oc]tavius Cn. f. Cn. n. pro pr. [ex] Macedon. et rege Perse naval. egit K. Dec.	an. DXXCV[I]
167	587	[L. Ani]cius L. f. M. n. Gallus pro pr. de rege [Gen]fio et Illurie[is] Quirinalibus	a. DXXCVI
166	588	[M. Cla]udius M. f. M. n. Marcellus cos. [de G]alleis Contrub[r]ieis et Liguribus [Elea]tibusque [K.] Interk.	a. DXXCVII
166	588	[C. Sulpici]us C. f. C. n. G[alus] cos. [de Ligur]ibus Ta[...]rneis x. K. Mart.	ann. DLXXXVII
158	596	[M. Fulvius] M. f. M. n. Nobilior pro cos. [de Liguri]bus Eleatibus xii. K. Sept.	a. DX[CV]
155	599	[M. Claudius M. f.] M. n. Marcellus II cos. II [de ...]us et Apua[neis ...]	a. DX[CIIX]
155	599	[P. Cornelius] P. f. Cn. [n. Scipio Nasica cos. II d]e De[lmateis ...]	[a. DXCIIX]
129	625	C. Sem[p]ronius C. f. C. n. Tuditan. cos. de Iapudibus K. Oct.	a. DCXXIV

=== Fourth tablet ===
Year BC	Year AUC	Entry	Annum
126	628	M'. Aquillius M'. f. M'. n. pro cos. ex A[si]a iii. Idus Novembr.	an. DCXXVII
123	631	M. Fu[lvi]us M. f. Q. n. Flaccus pro [cos. de Li]guribus Vocontieis Salluveisq. vi. [...]	an. DCXXX
122	632	C. Sextius C. f. C. n. Calvin. pro co[s.] de Ligurib. Vocontieis Salluveisq. [...]	[an. DCXXXI]
122	632	L. Aurelius L. f. L. n. Orestes pro cos. ex Sardinia vi. Idus Dec.	an. DC[XXXI]
121	633	Q. Caecilius Q. f. Q. n. Metellus Baliaric. pro cos. de Baliarib. pr. N[on. ...]	a. DCX[XXII]
120	634	Q. Fabius Q. Aemiliani f. Q. n. Maximus pro cos. de Allobro[gibus] et rege Arvernorum Betuito x. K. [...]	an. DC[XXXIII]
120	634	Cn. Domitius Cn. f. Cn. n. Ahenobarb. pro cos. de Galleis Arv[e]rneis xvi. K. [...]	a. D[CXXXIII]
117	637	L. Caecilius L. f. Q. n. Mete[ll]us Delmatic. pro cos. de De[lma]teis iii. No[n. ...]	ann. DCX[XXVI]
117	637	Q. Marcius Q. f. Q. n. Rex pro cos. de Liguribus Stoeneis iii. Non. De[c.]	an. DCX[XXVI]
115	639	M. Aemilius M. f. L. n. Scaurus cos. de Galleis Karneis v. [... De]c.	[an.] DCXXXIIX
111	643	M. Caecilius Q. f. Q. n. Mete[llus pro] cos. ex Sardini[a Idib. Quin]til.	[a]n. DCXLII
111	643	[C. Caeci]lius Q. f. Q. n. [Metellus Caprar. pro cos. ex Thraecia Idi]b. Quint.	a. DCXLII
110	644	[M. Livius C. f. M. Aimiliani n.] Drusus [pro cos. de Scordist]eis Macedonibusq. K. Mai.	a. DCXLIII
107	647	[Q. Servilius Cn. f. Cn. n.] Caepio pro [cos. ex Hispania ul]teriore v. K. Nov.	a. DCXLVI
106	648	[Q. Caecilius L. f. Q. n. Metel]l. Numidic. [pro cos. de Numideis et] rege Jugurtha [...]	a. DCXLVII
106	648	[M. Minucius Q. f. — n. Rufus pro] cos. [de Scordisteis et Thraecibus ...] K. Sext.	a. DCXLVII
104	650	[C. Marius C. f. C. n. cos. II de Numideis et rege Jugurtha K. Jan.]	[anno D]CXLIX
98	656	L. Cornelius P. f. L. n. Dolabell. pro cos. ex Hispania ulterior. de Lusitan. v. K. Feb.	a. DCLV
93	661	T. Didius T. f. Sex. n. II pro cos. ex Hispania de Celtibereis iiii. Idus Jun.	a. DCLX
93	661	P. Licinius M. f. P. n. Crassus pro cos. de Lusitaneis pridie Idus Jun.	an. DCLX
89	665	Cn. Pompeius Sex. f. Cn. n. Strabo cos. de Asculaneis Picentibus vi. K. Jan.	a. DCLXIV
88	666	[P. Serv]ilius C. f. M. n. Vatia pro pr. [de ...] xii. K. Novem.	an. DCLXV
81	673	[L. Cornelius L. f. P. n. Sull]a Felix dict. [de rege Mithridate I]V iii. K. Febr.	a. DCLXXII
81	673	[L. Licinius L. f. — n. Murena pro pr. [de rege Mithridate ...]	[an.] DCLXXII
62	692	[Q. Caecilius C. f. Q. n. Metellus Creticus pro cos. ex Creta insula ...] K. Jun.	[a]n. DC[XCI]
61	693	[Cn. Pompeius Cn. f. Sex. n. Magnus III] pro cos. [ex Asia Ponto Armenia Paphla]gonia Cappadoc. [Cilicia Syria Scytheis Judaeeis Alb]ania pirateis [per biduum III pridie K. O]ct.	a. DCXCII
54	700	[C. Pomptinus — f. — n. ... pro pr. de Allobrogibus iv. Non. Nov.]	a. DCXCIX
45	709	Q. Fabius Q. f. Q. n. Maximus cos. ex Hispania iii. Idus Octo.	an. DCCI[IX]
44	710	C. Julius C. f. C. n. Caesar VI dict. IIII ovans ex monte Albano vii. K. Febr.	a. DC[CIX]
43	711	L. Munatius L. f. L. n. Plancus pro cos. ex Gallia iiii. K. Jan.	an. [DCCX]
43	711	M. Aimilius M. f. Q. n. Lepidus IIIvir r. p. [c.] pro cos. ex Hispania pridie K. [Jan.]	[a. DCCX]
42	712	P. Vatinius P. f. pro cos. de Illurico pr. [K. Sex.]	a. DCCXI]
41	713	L. Antonius M. f. M. n. cos. ex Alpibus [K. Jan.]	[a. DCCXII]
40	714	Imp. Caesar divi f. C. f. IIIvir r. p. c. ov[ans] quod pacem cum M. Antonio fecit [...]	[an. DCCXIII]
40	714	M. Antonius M. f. M. n. IIIvir r. p. c. ovan[s] quod pacem cum Imp. Caesar feci[t ...]	[an. DCCXIII]
39	715	L. Marcius L. f. C. n. Censorinus cos. ex Macedonia K. Jan.	a. [DCCXIV]
39	715	C. Asinius Cn. f. Pollio pro cos. ex Parthineis viii. K. Novem.	an. [DCCXIV]
38	716	P. Ventidius P. f. pro cos. ex Tauro monte et Partheis v. K. Decem.	an. DCCX[V]
36	718	Cn. Domitius M. f. M. n. Calvinus pro cos. ex Hispania xvi. K. Sexil.	an. DCCXVII
36	718	Imp. Caesar divi f. C. f. II IIIvir r. p. c. II ovans ex Sicilia Idibus Novembr.	a. DCCXVII
34	720	T. Statilius T. f. Taurus pro cos. ex Africa pridie K. Jul.	ann. DCCXIX
34	720	C. Sosius C. f. T. n. pro cos. ex Judaea iii. Non. Septembr.	an. DCCXIX
34	720	C. Norbanus C. f. Flaccus pro cos. ex Hispania Id[us Oc]tobr.	an. DCCXIX
29	725	[C. Carrinas C. f. — n. pro cos. ex Gallia] prid. I[dus Jul.]	[an. DCCXXV]
29	725	L. Autronius P. f. L. n. Paetus pro cos. ex Africa xvii. K. Septemb[r.]	an. DCC[XXV]
28	726	M. Licinius M. f. M. n. Crassus pro cos. ex Thraecia et Geteis iv. Non. Jul.	a. DCCXXVI
28	726	M. Valerius M. f. M. n. Messalla Corvinus pro cos. ex Gallia vii. K. Oct.	a. DCCXXVI
26	728	Sex. Appuleius Sex. f. Sex. n. pro cos. ex Hispania vii. K. Febr.	a. DCCXXVII
21	733	L. Sempronius L. f. L. n. Atratinus pro cos. ex Africa iiii. Idus Oct.	a. DCCXXXII
19	735	L. Cornelius P. f. Balbus pro cos. ex Africa vi. K. April.	a. DCCXXXIV

=== Dates ===
The Romans dated events counting back from certain days in each month: the Kalends, marking the beginning of each month; the Ides, occurring on the fifteenth of March, May, Quintilis (July), and October, and the thirteenth of all other months; and the Nones, occurring on the seventh day of March, May, Quintilis, and October, and the fifth of all other months. Perhaps because these dates were remnants of the old lunar calendar, the Romans counted inclusively, so that the first day of the month was reckoned the first day before the Kalends. The last day of the previous month was ante diem ii. Kalendas, or pridie Kalendas, and the day before that was ante diem iii. Kalendas.

As a highly inflected language, Latin uses different cases depending on whether an event occurs on or from a day (ablative: Kalendis, Nonis, Idibus), or before a day (accusative: Kalendas, Nonas, Idus), but in each case the day is feminine and plural. The name of the month to which the day belonged is treated as an adjective modifying the day, and is therefore also feminine, plural, and either ablative or accusative. A few triumphs occurred in Interkalaris, or Mercedonius, an intercalary month used prior to Caesar's calendar reforms in 46 BC, and inserted following February in some years. Some of the dates in the Fasti Triumphales refer to specific religious festivals; for instance several triumphs were held Quirinalibus, "on the Quirinalia", and at least one was held on the Terminalia. The following table gives the inflected forms of the months used in the fasti:

Nominative (m. s.)

- Januarius
- Februarius
- Interkalaris
- Martius
- Aprilis
- Maius
- Junius
- Quintilis
- Sextilis
- September
- October
- November
- December

Accusative (f. pl.)

- Januarias
- Februarias
- Interkalares
- Martias
- Apriles
- Maias
- Junias
- Quintiles
- Sextiles
- Septembres
- Octobres
- Novembres
- Decembres

Ablative (f. pl.)

- Januariis
- Februariis
- Interkalaribus
- Martiis
- Aprilibus
- Maiis
- Juniis
- Quintilibus
- Sextilibus
- Septembribus
- Octobribus
- Novembribus
- Decembribus

Thus, a date abbreviated "iii. Non. Oct." represents ante diem tertium Nonas Octobres, i.e. the third day before the Nones of October, or October 5, while "Idib. Dec." represents Idibus Decembribus, occurring precisely on the Ides of December, or December 13, and "pridie K. Quint." would be pridie Kalendas Quintiles, or the last day of June. After the death of Caesar, the month of Quintilis officially became Julius (accusative feminine plural Julias, ablative Juliis), and in 8 BC, Sextilis became Augustus (accusative feminine plural Augustas, ablative Augustis), but the latter month does not appear in the Triumphal Fasti, which end in 19 BC.

=== Peoples and places ===
All of the people and places mentioned in the Fasti Triumphales occur in the ablative case: de Samnitibus means, roughly, "(he triumphed) over the Samnites"; pro cos. ex Hispania means "proconsul of (literally out of or from) Spain". In this list, the first form is the one appearing in the fasti, and the second is the nominative, or uninflected form. The suffix -que, usually abbreviated -q., means "and", combining the preceding words with the one to which it is attached; de Veientibus Sabineisque means "over the Veientes and the Sabines".

==== Peoples ====
- Aequeis = Aequi (Aequians)
- Aetoleis = Aetoli (Aetolians)
- Allobrogibus = Allobroges
- Anagneis = Anagni
- Antemnatibus = Antemnates
- Antiatibus = Antiates
- Apuaneis = Apuani
- Apuleis = Apuli (Apulians)
- Arverneis = Arverni
- Asculaneis = Asculani
- Aurunceis = Aurunci
- Baliaribus = Baleares
- Boieis = Boii
- Bruttieis = Bruttii (Bruttians)
- Caenensibus = Caeninenses
- Caleneis = Caleni
- Campaneis = Campani (Campanians)
- Celtibereis = Celtiberi (Celtiberians)
- Contrubrieis = Contrubri (Contrubrian Gauls)
- Corseis = Corsi (Corsicans)
- Cossurensibus = Cossurienses
- Delmateis = Dalmatae (Dalmatians)
- Eleatibus = Eleates
- Etrusceis = Etrusci (Etruscans)
- Falisceis = Falisci (Faliscans)
- Galleis = Galli (Gauls)
- Germaneis = Germani
- Geteis = Getae
- Herniceis = Hernici (Hernicians)
- Hispaneis = Hispani
- Histreis = Histri (Istrians)
- Iapudibus = Iapydes
- Illurieis = Illyri (Illyrians)
- Insubribus = Insubres (Insubrian Gauls)
- Judaeeis = Judaei (Jews)
- Karneis = Carni
- Latineis = Latini (Latins)
- Lavinieis = Lavinii (should be Lanuvii)
- Liguribus = Ligures (Ligurians)
- Lucaneis = Lucani (Lucanians)
- Lusitaneis = Lusitani (Lusitanians)
- Macedonibus = Macedones (Macedonians)
- Marseis = Marsi (Marsians)
- Medullineis = Medullini
- Messapieis = Messapii (Messapians)
- Nequinatibus = Nequinates
- Numideis = Numidi (Numidians)
- Palaeopolitaneis = Palaeopolitani (Palaeopolitans)
- Partheis = Parthi (Parthians)
- Parthineis = Parthi (Parthians)
- Pedaneis = Pedani
- Peicentibus = Picentes (Picentines)
- Poeneis = Punici (Carthaginians)
- Privernatibus = Privernates
- Regineis = Rhegini
- Sabineis = Sabini (Sabines)
- Sallentineis = Sallentini
- Salluveis = Saluvii
- Samnitibus = Samnites
- Sardeis = Sardi (Sardinians)
- Sassinatibus = Sassinates
- Satricaneis = Satricani
- Scordisteis = Scordisci
- Scytheis = Scythi (Scythians)
- Siculeis = Siculi (Sicels)
- Sidicineis = Sidicini
- Soraneis = Sorani
- Stoeneis = Stoeni
- Tarentineis = Tarentines
- Tarquiniensibus = Tarquinienses
- Thraecibus = Thraci (Thracians)
- Tiburtibus = Tiburtines
- Tusceis = Tusci (Etruscans)
- Veientibus = Veientes
- Veliterneis = Veliterni
- Vocontieis = Vocontii
- Volsceis = Volsci (Volscians)
- Volsonibus = Volsinienses
- Vulcientibus = Vulcientes
- Vulsiniensibus = Volsinienses

==== Places ====
- Africa
- Albania
- Alpibus = Alpes (the Alps)
- Armenia
- Asia
- Cappadocia
- Cephallenia
- Cilicia
- Clastidium
- Corsica
- Creta Insula
- Hispania
- Illurico = Illyricum
- Hispania Celtiberia
- Gallia
- Hispania Citerior
- Hispania Ulterior
- Judaea
- Lusitania
- Macedonia
- Monte Albano = Mons Albanus (Mount Albanus)
- Paphlagonia
- Ponto = Pontus
- Sardinia
- Sicilia (Sicily)
- Syria
- Tauro monte = Montes Tauri (Taurus Mountains)
- Thraecia (Thrace)

==== Persons ====
- rege Antiocho = Antiochus III the Great
- rege Arvernorum Betuito = Bituitus, King of the Arverni
- rege Genfio = Gentius, King of the Ardiaei ("Genfio" an error)
- rege Jugurtha = Jugurtha, King of Numidia
- rege Mithridate IV = Mithridates VI of Pontus ("IV" an error)
- rege Perse = Perseus of Macedon
- rege Philippo = Philip V of Macedon
- rege Pyrrho = Pyrrhus of Epirus
- rege Siculorum Hierone = Hiero II of Syracuse ("King of the Sicels")
- Viridomaro = Viridomarus, a Gallic chieftain

==== Things ====
- classe Poenica = classis Poenica, the Carthaginian navy
- pacem = pax, peace
- pirateis = piratae, pirates

== See also ==
- List of Roman consuls
- List of Roman dictators

== Bibliography ==
- Theodor Mommsen et alii, Corpus Inscriptionum Latinarum (The Body of Latin Inscriptions, abbreviated CIL), Berlin-Brandenburgische Akademie der Wissenschaften (1853–present).
- René Cagnat et alii, L'Année épigraphique (The Year in Epigraphy, abbreviated AE), Presses Universitaires de France (1888–present).
- Rodolfo Lanciani, New Tales of Old Rome, Macmillan & Company, London (1901).
- John Edwin Sandys: Latin Epigraphy: an Introduction to the Study of Latin Inscriptions, Cambridge University Press (1919).
- Oxford Classical Dictionary, N. G. L. Hammond and H. H. Scullard, eds., Clarendon Press, Oxford (Second Edition, 1970).
