= Pomptina gens =

Ancient Roman family

The gens Pomptina was a minor plebeian family at ancient Rome. The gens is best known from Gaius Pomptinus, praetor in 63 BC, who helped suppress the conspiracy of Catiline, and later defeated the Allobroges. Few of the Pomptini appear in history, but others are known from inscriptions.

== Origin ==
The nomen Pomptinus seems to be derived from the region of the Pomptine Marshes, in southeastern Latium. This area was brought under Roman control following the defeat of the Volscians in 358 BC, and the tribus Pomptina organized. The Pomptini might be of either Latin or Volscian origin. In different sources, the nomen can be found as Pomptinius, Pontinius, and Pomtinus.

== Members ==
This list includes abbreviated praenomina. For an explanation of this practice, see filiation.

- Gaius Pomptinus, a legate under Marcus Licinius Crassus during the Third Servile War, and praetor in 63 BC, where he assisted the consul Marcus Tullius Cicero suppress the conspiracy of Catiline. He was then assigned the province of Gallia Narbonensis, and defeated the Allobroges, although he did not obtain a triumph until 54.
- Pomptinus, built a tomb for his wife, Audasia Charitu, aged thirty, at Theveste in Africa Proconsularis. Perhaps the same person as Pomptinus Primitius, the heir of Gaius Audasius Succedens.
- Gaius Pomptinus, a soldier stationed at Rome in AD 70.
- Quintus Pomptinus Q. f., named in an inscription from Rome.
- Sextus Pomptinus, named in an inscription from Rome.
- Titus Pontinius, primus pilus in the fifth legion, buried at Ameria in Umbria, during the first half of the first century.
- Quintus Pontinius Capito, one of the Seviri Augustales, according to an inscription from Avennio in Gallia Narbonensis.
- Gaius Pomptinus C. l. Eros, a freedman named in an inscription from Rome.
- Gaius Pomptinus Eutychus, named in a funerary inscription from Rome.
- Gaius Pomptinus C. l. Fortunatus, a freedman named in an inscription from Rome.
- Gaius Pontinius Magnus, built a tomb at Rome for his wife, Valeria, aged twenty-three.
- Gaius Pomptinus Phoebus, a soldier stationed at Rome in AD 70.
- Gaius Pomptinus Postumus, named in an inscription from Rome.
- Pomptinus Primitius, perhaps the same Pomptinus who married Audasia Charitu, one of the heirs of Gaius Audasius Succedens, according to a funerary inscription from Theveste.
- Gaius Pomptinus C. l. Probus, a freedman named in an inscription from Rome.
- Gaius Pomptinus Proculus, named in an inscription from Rome.
- Gaius Pomptinus Saturninus, a soldier stationed at Rome in AD 70.
- Gaius Pomptinius Superbus, named in an inscription from Consoranni in Aquitania.

== See also ==
- List of Roman gentes

== Bibliography ==
- Marcus Tullius Cicero, De Provinciis Consularibus, Epistulae ad Atticum, Epistulae ad Familiares, Epistulae ad Quintum Fratrem, In Catilinam, In Pisonem.
- Gaius Sallustius Crispus (Sallust), Bellum Catilinae (The Conspiracy of Catiline).
- Titus Livius (Livy), History of Rome.
- Sextus Julius Frontinus, Strategemata (Stratagems).
- Lucius Cassius Dio Cocceianus (Cassius Dio), Roman History.
- Dictionary of Greek and Roman Biography and Mythology, William Smith, ed., Little, Brown and Company, Boston (1849).
- Theodor Mommsen et alii, Corpus Inscriptionum Latinarum (The Body of Latin Inscriptions, abbreviated CIL), Berlin-Brandenburgische Akademie der Wissenschaften (1853–present).
- Bullettino della Commissione Archeologica Comunale in Roma (Bulletin of the Municipal Archaeological Commission of Rome, abbreviated BCAR), (1872–present).
- T. Robert S. Broughton, The Magistrates of the Roman Republic, American Philological Association (1952).
