= Battle of Vindalium =

121 BC battle

- Part of the First Transalpine War
Date	121 BC
Location	Near Sorgues, modern day France
Result	Roman victory

Belligerents
Roman Republic	Allobroges

Commanders and leaders
Quintus Fabius Maximus Allobrogicus	

Casualties and losses
Unknown	at least 23,000 (per ancient sources)

The Battle of Vindalium (121 BC) took place near Vindalium, a Cavarian settlement probably corresponding to modern day Mourre-de-Sève in Sorgues, near the confluence of the Rhône and Durance rivers in Southern France. The battle opposed the Allobroges, a Gallic tribe dwelling further north between the Rhône and the Alps, to the Roman forces of proconsul Gnaeus Domitius Ahenobarbus.

== Background ==
According to scholar Louis Rawlings, "the Roman expansion into Transalpine Gaul aimed to help the Greek colony of Massalia (Marseille) against the Saluvii (or Salyes) and to secure a land route to the Roman provinces in Spain."

In 125 BC, the consul Marcus Fulvius Flaccus crossed the Alps and subdued the Saluvii, a Ligurian tribe that dwelled near Massalia. In 123 or 122 BC, the proconsul Gaius Sextius Calvinus defeated Toutomotulus, king of the Saluvii, and sacked their oppidum at Entremont. The Allobroges gave shelter to the Saluvii chieftains, among them Toutomotulus. The alliance of the Romans with the Aedui, a Gallic tribe from modern Burgundy, reportedly led the Allobroges and Arveni to raid the Aedui territory in revenge.

== Battle of Vindalium ==
In 121 BC, the Allobroges sent an envoy to the Romans on the behalf of Toutomotulus (Toutomotoulos). The proconsul Gnaeus Domitius Ahenobarbus demanded that the Saluvii chieftains be given to Rome, but the Allobroges refused. Domitius Ahenobarbus decided to attack the Allobroges before they could join their forces with the Arveni.

The Battle of Vindalium was fought in the territory of the Cavares, near the oppidum Vindalium (probably Mourre-de-Sève, in Sorgues) just northeast of Avenio (Avignon). The Allobrogian cavalry reportedly feared the Roman war elephants during the battle. Orosius writes that they lost 20,000 men, and that 3,000 of them were captured.

Shortly afterwards, the Arveni and their king Bituitus met the Roman forces of Domitius Ahenobarbus, strengthened by the troops of Quintus Fabius Maximus, probably near present-day Bollène. A confederation of Allobroges, Arverni, and the remaining Saluvii eventually fought the Roman army at the Battle of the Isère River later in 121 BC, which turned into a decisive Roman victory.

== See also ==
- Battle of the Isère River
