= Battle of the Isère River =

121 BC battle

- Part of the Roman–Gallic wars
Date	8 August 121 BC
Location	Near Valence, modern day France
Result	Roman victory
Territorial changes	Annexation of the Rhône Valley by Rome

Belligerents
Roman Republic	Allobroges; Arverni; Saluvii

Commanders and leaders
Quintus Fabius Maximus Allobrogicus; Gnaeus Domitius Ahenobarbus	Bituitus

Strength
Less than 30,000 men	120,000–200,000 men (disputed)

Casualties and losses
15 killed	120,000–150,000 killed (disputed)

The Battle of the Isère River (8 August 121 BC) took place near the modern day French town of Valence at the confluence of the Isère and Rhône rivers. A first confrontation had been won by Gnaeus Domitius Ahenobarbus at the Battle of Vindalium, further south in the Rhône Valley, before Ahenobarbus and Quintus Fabius Maximus Allobrogicus joined their forces, defeating a confederation of Allobroges, Arverni and some Salluvii warriors at the Isère River.

Roman consular legions were dispatched into Gaul repeatedly over a time period stretching from 125 to 121 BC to assist allies who repeatedly had come under attack from various Gallic tribes, most prominently the Salluvii, Allobroges, and Arverni. Each year during this time, a newly elected consul was dispatched by the Senate to Cisalpine Gaul in an effort to finally end the threat posed by these tribes towards the Roman allies in the region, and ultimately, to establish direct Roman control of the area.

It has been suggested that given the estimated number of at least 120,000 Celtic warriors killed, were it not for the relative lack of details available, the battle would be one of the most famous in Roman history.

== Background ==
Up until 125 BC, Roman influence had not yet been expanded into the region of coastline between the Alps and the Pyrenees. That year, however, the Romans were inexorably pulled into conflict in the area as their long-time trading partner and ally, the city of Massalia, was attacked by a Gallic-Ligurian people, the Salluvii. According to scholar Louis Rawlings, "the Roman expansion into Transalpine Gaul aimed to help the Greek colony of Massilia (Marseille) against the Saluvii (or Salyes) and to secure a land route to the Roman provinces in Spain." The establishment of a Greek colony at Glanum, on Salluvian territory, may have been the casus belli.

The Senate dispatched that year's consul, Marcus Fulvius Flaccus, to deal with the threat that was now menacing the Roman ally. Defeating the Saluvii, Flaccus became the first Roman to vanquish any of the Ligurian peoples beyond the Alps, and was awarded a triumph upon his return to Rome in 122 BC. During Flaccus’ time fighting in Gaul, he was accompanied by Gaius Sextius Calvinus, who had been appointed consul for the year of 124 BC. Calvinus, after defeating the Salluvii along with Flaccus, went on to found the colony of Aquae Sextiae, named as such for its proximity to various streams of cold and warm water.

The Roman victory was not all-encompassing, however, for Teutomalius, king of the Saluvii, gathered his surviving men and joined with the Allobroges, creating an even larger threat for the burgeoning Roman power in Gaul. Concerned, the Senate again dispatched a consul, this one elected for the year 122 BC, named Gnaeus Domitius Ahenobarbus. This Roman force was sent northwards under the pretext that the Allobroges had received the Roman enemy Teutomalius, and had combined with his remaining forces to attack a Roman ally in the region, a tribe known as the Aedui. It is possible, however, that an alternate motive existed for this maneuver by the Romans, judging by the fact that Ahenobarbus had a clear ambition to construct a road which would link Roman-controlled areas in Gaul and Spain to each other.

The Roman force finally met decisively with the force of Allobroges, the remaining Salluvi led by Teutomalius, and Arverni under their king Bituitus, at the Battle of Vindalium on the confluence of the rivers Sulga and Rhône, near modern-day Avignon. The Romans won a victory, largely aided by their use of war elephants, the presence of which terrified and scattered many of the Gauls and their horses. Some 20,000 Allobroges were reportedly killed by the Romans there, with a further three thousand being captured.

This victory too, however, much like Calvinus's before, was not comprehensive. The Arverni king Bituitus, having evaded capture at Vindalium, continued resistance against the victorious Romans. Ahenobarbus’ campaign therefore dragged on into 121 BC, whereupon he was joined by a newly elected consul for that year, Quintus Fabius Maximus Allobrogicus.

== Battle ==
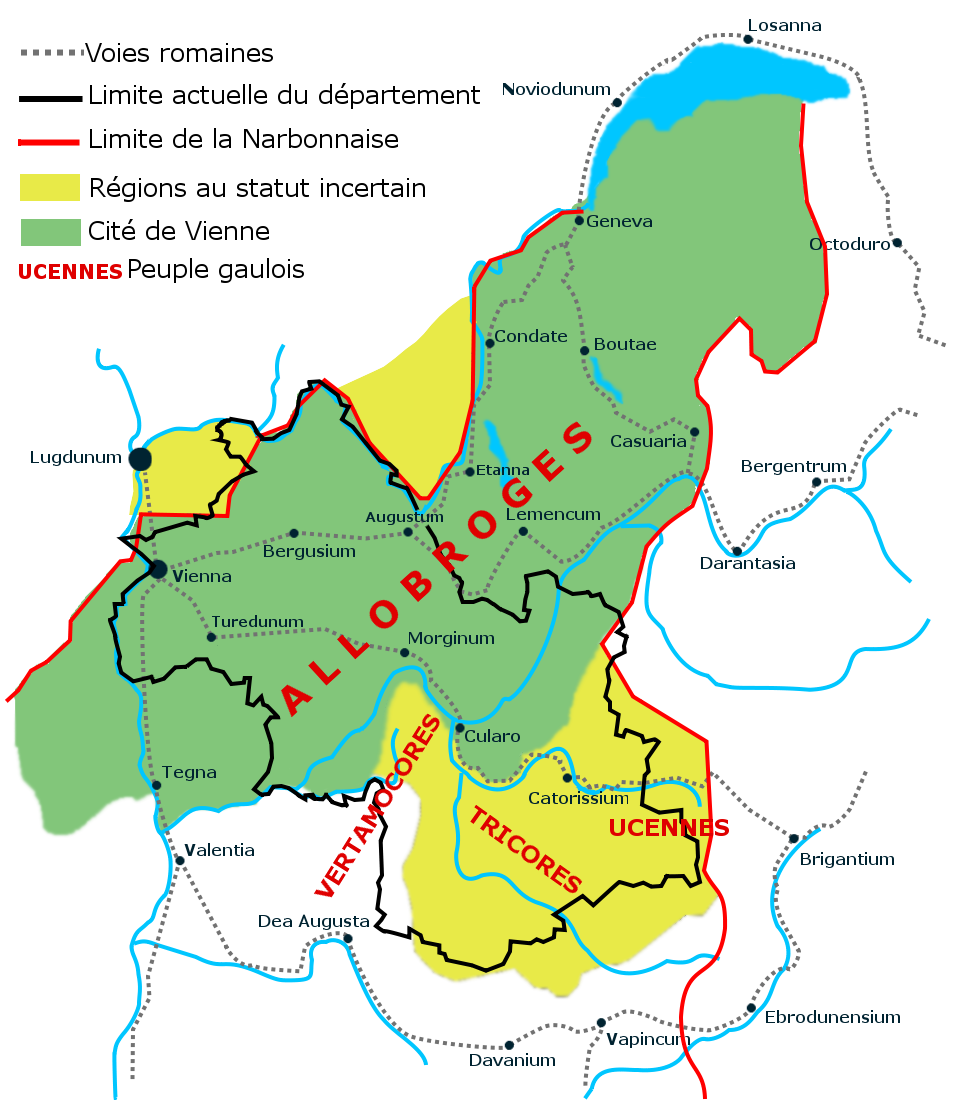
Territory belonging to the Allobroges. Note the usage of Latin names: Valence is Valentia; Vienne is Vienna

Bituitus again lined up for battle in August of 121 BC against the united Roman forces of Fabius Maximus and Ahenobarbus with a massive army, positioning it at the confluence of the Isère and Rhône rivers near modern-day Valence, where they meet with the Cemennus Mountains. So unimpressed was the Arverni king with the size of the combined Roman army which had appeared to face him that he declared it "would scarcely suffice to feed the dogs that were with his army". Strabo places the number of Roman soldiers at less than 30,000.

Few specifics are known about the ensuing Battle of the Isère River. According to Orosius, the Gauls had assembled an army numbering 180,000 men, although this claim seems implausibly large. Strabo puts the number of Gauls as high as 200,000. It may be assumed that many of the same Roman war elephants which were employed in the previous overwhelming victory at the Battle of Vindalium were used in the same fashion against the Gauls. Appian writes that Fabius, who had sustained an injury shortly before the battle, continued to lead his troops during the fighting, urging his men on while being borne on a litter, sometimes even rising and hobbling around, supported by them. Pliny adds that Fabius was also afflicted during the battle by a quartan ague, which he 'got rid of' during the action, though this was perhaps the same 'wound' Appian wrote of.

Orosius, in the most vivid extant ancient description of the battle, writes as follows:

Realising that the one bridge over the river Rhone was too small for him to lead his troops across, Bituitus had another constructed by chaining together small boats over which he spread boards and fastened them down. A battle was begun which raged long and fiercely, finally ending in the defeat and rout of the Gauls. For the Gauls, while each man was thinking of his own safety, thoughtlessly allowed too great a concentration of their columns and in their haste to cross broke the chains binding the bridge. Boats and men immediately sank. Of the one hundred and eighty thousand soldiers reported in the army of Bituitus, one hundred and fifty thousand were slain or drowned.

— Orosius, History Against the Pagans Book 5, Chapter 14

It is clear that the Arverni horde, crossing to the left bank of the Rhône, found themselves fighting with their backs against the water, a reality which undoubtedly contributed to their defeat. The panic following the initial breaking of their lines as their soldiers turned, rushing to cross back over the river, can be imagined, and was perhaps the most significant factor leading to the totality of their defeat. So, despite the Romans being far outnumbered in battle, their victory was complete. Orosius mentions that the Gauls lost some 150,000 men, although this figure is likely exaggerated. Livy records the Gallic losses at the slightly more conservative number of 120,000 killed, while Pliny claims 130,000 killed. Appian states that Roman losses numbered only 15 men.

== Aftermath ==
It is unknown whether the Arverni king Bituitus was captured during the battle or at some point afterward. Some ancient authors claim the former, while others, notably Valerius, claim that Ahenobarbus, following the battle, took Bituitus into custody through deceit. That author writes:

Too great a desire of glory drove Cn. Domitius, a person of noble family and distinction, to become treacherous. He was angry with Bituitus, king of the Arverni, because he had persuaded both his own people and the Allobroges, while Domitius was in the province, to appeal to the protection of Fabius his successor. Sending for Bituitus under pretence of speaking with him, and having received him hospitably, he caused him to be put in fetters, and sent him away by sea to Rome. The senate could neither approve this act of his nor revoke it, lest Bituitus, being sent back into his country, should start a new war. Therefore they sent him to Alba to be imprisoned.

— Valerius Maximus, Nine books of memorable deeds and sayings Book 9, Chapter 6.3

A modern historian, Dyson, opines that Ahenobarbus' motivation to do such a thing may have been rivalry, fearing that "Bituitus would surrender the Allobroges and Arverni to Fabius, thus enhancing the reputation of his rival", thus motivating him to act first and capture the vanquished king himself.

Whatever the case, it is clear that Bituitus was at some stage shipped back to Rome in anticipation of a triumph to celebrate the massive Roman victory. The significance of the victory, meanwhile, was not lost on the proud Ahenobarbus and Fabius, who both erected towers of stone where their victories in the campaign had been won, adorning them with captured arms of the enemy in a gloating display visible to the local Gauls, an upbraiding which, according to Roman historian Florus, was unusual, and showed what the hard-fought victories meant to the Roman commanders. Strabo elaborates further, writing that Fabius Maximus Allobrogicus, whom he confuses for his father Fabius Maximus Aemilianus, "set up a trophy of white marble, and also two temples, one in honour of Ares, the other in honour of Heracles." Suetonius records that Ahenobarbus, following the victory, "rode through the province on an elephant, attended by a throng of soldiers, in a kind of triumphal procession", though he mistakenly attributes the victory to the victorious general's son, Gnaeus Domitius Ahenobarbus, consul for 96 BC.

Upon the completion of the battle, a Salluvian named Crato, the leader of a pro-Graeco-Roman faction within the tribe, was spared from enslavement, as were nine hundred of his fellow Salluvian citizens. This became the group which would go on to form the basis of a loyal Roman population in the area. In commemoration of the victory, Fabius was given the cognomen Allobrogicus, and both he and Ahenobarbus were awarded triumphs in 120 BC. Bituitus and his son, Congonnetiacus, were imprisoned at Alba Longa, his return to Gaul seeming "not to be in the interest of tranquility". Fabius' triumph in particular was renowned for its splendour, as the Arverni king, transferred to Rome from his prison, was paraded throughout the streets of Rome in the same silver armour which he had worn into battle. Eutropius writes that among the booty brought back to Rome were a great many golden collars, formerly belonging to the Gauls. To further commemorate his victory, Allobrogicus erected a triumphal arch (fornix), at the Via Sacra, between the Regia and the House of the Vestals, the first ever to be constructed in the forum. Atop the arch was erected a sculpture of the victorious consul.

It appears that the Romans did not impose heavy punishment upon the defeated Arverni, as recalled by Julius Caesar, who claims in regard to them that "the Roman people had pardoned them, and had not formed them into a province nor imposed a tribute". With the Arvernian hegemony in southern Gaul broken, the Romans were met with no opposition in the area for the next two decades, continuing to use their military base at Aquae Sextiae with impunity. Hall, a modern historian, notes that the Arverni being forced to give up their claim to the Rhône Valley laid the groundwork for the later foundation of a Roman Province, known simply as Provincia Romana, that is, Provence. Thus the ultimate path for further annexation in Gaul, first by Gaius Marius and then much more widely by Julius Caesar, was cleared. Vitally and most immediately to this effect began the construction of the Via Domitia, commissioned and named after Ahenobarbus, linking Italy and Hispania through the newly secured territory. Thus, the first permanent Roman colony outside of Italy and the single Roman seaport in Gaul, Narbo, was founded on the course of the new road some three years after the battle.

== Legacy ==
It is clear from the wealth of relevant sources, ranging through the centuries of Classical Antiquity, that the crushing victory left an enduring mark upon the Roman psyche. For example, this cultural consciousness is clear in the words of a speech given decades later by Marcus Tullius Cicero, part of which was spoken regarding the contemporaneous threat posed by the Gallic Treviri chieftain Induciomarus to the Romans. Cicero wishes comically that in response to this threat the Romans might bring Gaius Marius back from the dead, or even Gnaeus Domitius (Ahenobarbus) and Quintius Maximus (Allobrogicus), who might "again subdue and crush the nation of the Allobroges and the other tribes by their arms".

The battle was also known by Julius Caesar, the famous subduer of the Gauls, who used it as a justification for the continuation of his conquests. He used the subjugation of the Gauls by Allobrogicus to justify their belonging to the Roman people, rather than to Ariovistus, his Gallic opponent. He argued that just as the Gauls were allowed to observe their own laws following their defeat by the aforementioned general, so too would they be allowed, following Caesar's future conquest, to do the same.

Knowledge of the battle endured into the Middle Ages. It is written of in the 15th-century poet John Lydgate's work, The Fall of Princes, and illustrated in Vincent de Beauvais' Speculum Historiale.

== See also ==
- Battle of Vindalium

== Notes ==
- According to Mike Duncan, it is likely the Gaius Marius participated in the battle as a quaestor
- It is possible that the Achaian League also sent troops to bolster Ahenobarbus' army in particular, though the inscription in question may be referring to a different, earlier member of that distinguished family.
- The battle has been called in other languages the Battle of the Confluence [fr], the Battle of the Rhône, as well as the Battle of Valence [nl].
