= Gaius Papirius Carbo (consul 120 BC) =

Roman politician and orator (c.163–119 BC)

Gaius Papirius Carbo (c. 163 – 119 BC) was a Roman orator and politician.

== Career ==
Carbo was associated with the populist politician Gaius Gracchus in carrying out the provision of the agrarian law of his brother, Tiberius Gracchus. As tribune of the people in 131 BC, Carbo carried the lex Papiria extending the secret ballot for the enactment and repeal of laws. He also proposed that the tribunes should be allowed to become candidates for the same office in successive years, a response to the fate of Tiberius. The proposal was defeated, having been opposed by Scipio Aemilianus, in whose sudden death in 129 BC Carbo was suspected of having a hand.

Carbo subsequently went over to the anti-populist optimates, and as consul in 120 BC successfully defended Lucius Opimius, when he was impeached for the murder of a citizen (Gaius Gracchus) without a trial. At trial, he said that Gracchus had been justly slain. But the optimates did not trust Carbo, and he was impeached by Lucius Crassus on a similar charge. Feeling that he had nothing to hope for from the optimates and that his condemnation was certain, he committed suicide.

His son, Gaius Papirius Carbo Arvina, was remembered for his attempts to avenge his father's fate. He followed his father's prosecutor, L. Crassus, to the latter's province in 94 BC with the aim of finding a reason to prosecute him. Finding this out, L. Crassus decided not only to forgive the son, but even to grant him a position within his close circle of advisors.

Political offices
Preceded by Lucius Opimius; Q. Fabius Maximus Allobrogicus	Roman consul 120 BC; With: Publius Manilius	Succeeded by L. Caecilius Metellus; L. Aurelius Cotta
