= Lucius Opimius =

Ancient Roman politician and general, consul in 121 BCE

Lucius Opimius was a Roman politician who held the consulship in 121 BC, in which capacity and year he ordered the execution of 3,000 supporters of popular leader Gaius Gracchus without trial, using as pretext the state of emergency declared after Gracchus's recent and turbulent death. He was censured in 116 BC by a tribunal investigating illicit bribes taken from Jugurtha, king of Numidia, by his commission tasked with dividing territory between the king and his brother. He then left Rome to Dyrrhachium in exile where he later died.

== Biography ==
He is first mentioned for crushing the revolt of the town of Fregellae in 125 BC. He was elected consul in 121 BC with Quintus Fabius Maximus Allobrogicus, and while Fabius was campaigning in Gaul, he took part in perhaps the most decisive event of Roman history to that point.

When Gaius Gracchus and M. Fulvius Flaccus were defeated for re-election by Opimius and Fabius, Gracchus organized a mass protest on the Aventine Hill. Alarmed by this action, the Senate passed the motion senatus consultum ultimum, which Opimius understood as an order to suppress their activities by any means necessary—including force. He gathered an armed force of Senators and their supporters, and confronted Gracchus and his followers, an act which quickly became a pitched battle inside the city of Rome. Flaccus and his eldest son were slain in the conflict and Gracchus committed assisted suicide with the help of his servant, Philocrates, who then took his own life. After clearing the streets of his opponents, Opimius established a quaestio or tribunal that condemned to death 3,000 people accused of being supporters of Gracchus.

Opimius was prosecuted for these violent actions in 120 BC, but Carbo won his acquittal. Opimius' victory established the senatus consultum ultimum in Roman constitutional practice, providing a limitless tool that the various Roman factions used against each other in the following years as the Republic slipped increasingly into violence and civil war.

In 116 BC, Opimius headed a commission that divided Numidia between Jugurtha and his brother Adherbal. Suspecting that the commission had been influenced by bribes from Jugurtha, its members were later investigated by a tribunal that censured their conduct. Humiliated, Opimius went into exile in Dyrrhachium, where he later died.

== See also ==
- Gracchi brothers

Preceded by Gnaeus Domitius Ahenobarbus and Gaius Fannius	Consul of the Roman Republic with Quintus Fabius Maximus Allobrogicus; 121 BC	Succeeded by Gaius Papirius Carbo and Publius Manilius
