= Pointe Allobrogia =

Mountain in Switzerland

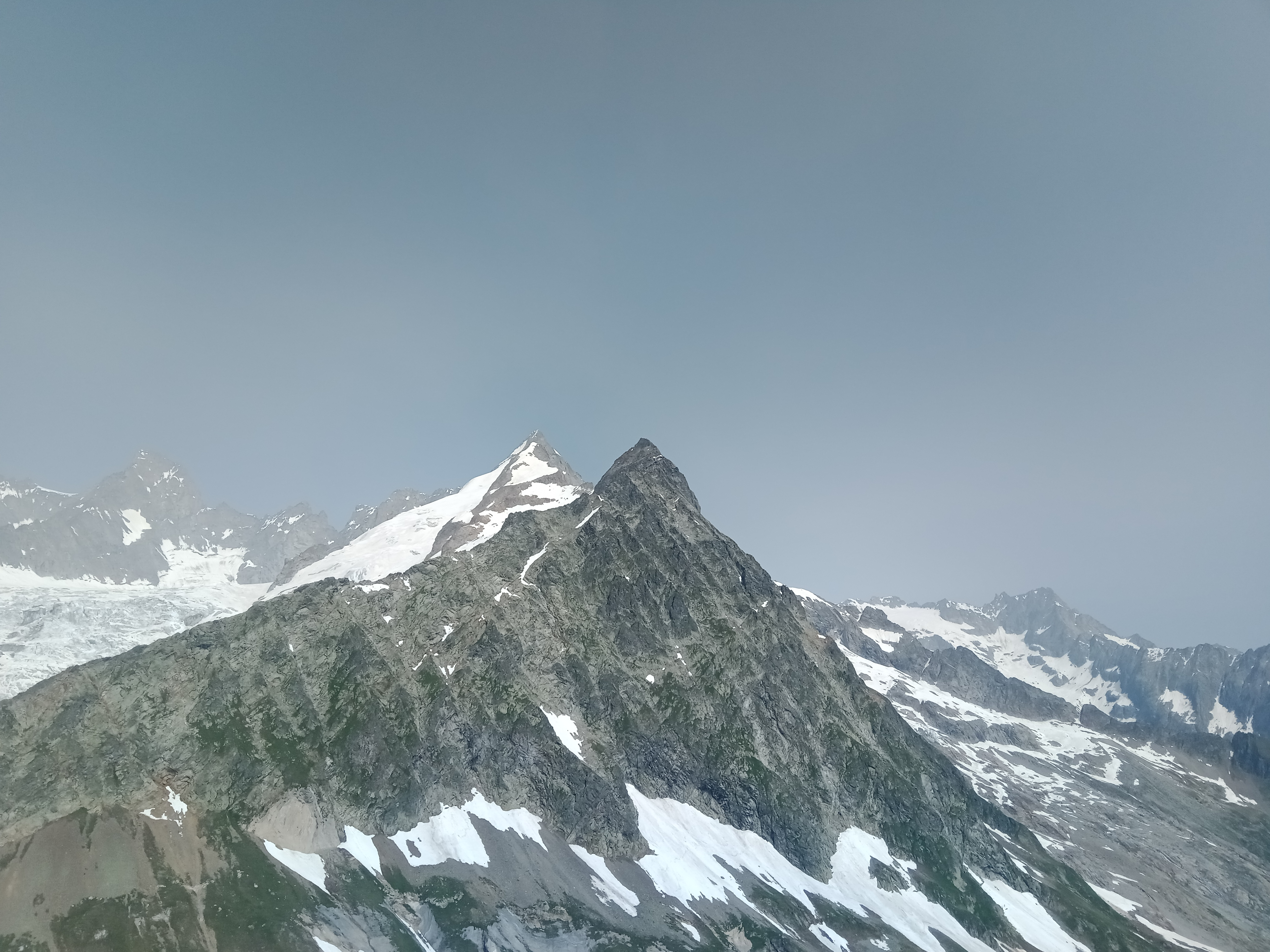

Highest point
- Elevation: 3,172 m (10,407 ft)
- Prominence: 42 m (138 ft)
- Coordinates: 45°54′33″N 7°03′51″E

Geography
- Location within Alps
- Location: Valais, Switzerland; Aosta Valley, Italy
- Parent range: Mont Blanc Massif

The Pointe Allobrogia is a mountain of the Mont Blanc massif, overlooking the Col Ferret on the border between Italy and Switzerland. It lies at the southern end of the range south-east of Mont Dolent.

== Name ==
The toponym is related to the name of the Allobroges. This may be the remnant of an ancient territorial claim made by the Gallic tribe.
