= Gaius Fannius =

Roman politician

Gaius Fannius (fl. 2nd century BC) was a Roman republican politician who was elected consul in 122 BC and was one of the principal opponents of Gaius Gracchus. He was a member of the Scipionic Circle.

== Career ==
Gaius Fannius was the son of Marcus Fannius (whose brother was probably Gaius Fannius Strabo, the consul of 161 BC). (Note: There has been a long-standing debate over whether this Gaius Fannius was the historian who served under Scipio Aemilianus during the Third Punic War, and together with Tiberius Gracchus were the first to mount the walls of Carthage on the capture of the city. Cicero, from whose letters much of this is derived, was incorrect in identifying Fannius the consul as the son of Gaius; inscriptions clearly reveal that his father was Marcus Fannius. It is now generally accepted that Cicero, although mistaken about some of the details, was probably not mistaken when he distinguished between Gaius Fannius, the Consul of 122 BC and Gaius Fannius, the historian who served under Scipio Aemilianus. See Cornell, T. J. The Fragments of the Roman Historians (2013), pp. 244-247 for a detailed analysis of the evidence.) On the assumption that this Gaius Fannius was not the historian who fought in the Third Punic War, in 146 BC he was a member of Quintus Caecilius Metellus Macedonicus' staff in Macedonia, who sent him as part of an embassy to the Achaean League to convince them not to enter the war against Rome. After the embassy was insulted and their warnings disregarded, Fannius left and went to Athens.

Fannius next appears in 141 BC, serving with distinction as a military tribune in Hispania Ulterior under Quintus Fabius Maximus Servilianus in his war against Viriathus. It is assumed that sometime after 139 BC (possibly 137 BC), Fannius was elected as plebeian tribune. Then probably around 127/6 BC, he was elected to the praetorship and during his term he was mentioned in a decree responding to the request for Roman assistance by John Hyrcanus, the ruler of the Hasmonean Kingdom.

In 122 BC, with the support of the tribune of the plebs Gaius Gracchus, Fannius was elected consul with Gnaeus Domitius Ahenobarbus as his colleague. However, once he was in office, he turned against Gracchus, opposing his measures. During his consulship he obeyed the senate's directive to issue a proclamation commanding citizens of Italian allies to leave Rome. He also spoke against Gracchus' proposal to extend the franchise to the Latins. Fannius' speech was regarded as an oratorical masterpiece in Cicero's time, and was widely read.

== Family ==
Gaius Fannius married Laelia, the daughter of Gaius Laelius Sapiens. On the advice of his father-in-law, Fannius attended the lectures of the Stoic philosopher, Panaetius, at Rhodes.

== Sources ==
- Broughton, T. Robert S., The Magistrates of the Roman Republic, Vol I (1952)
- Broughton, T. Robert S., The Magistrates of the Roman Republic, Vol III (1986)
- Cornell, T. J. The Fragments of the Roman Historians (2013)
- Smith, William, Dictionary of Greek and Roman Biography and Mythology, Vol II (1867)
- Smith, William, Dictionary of Greek and Roman Biography and Mythology, Vol III (1867)

Political offices
Preceded by Q. Caecilius Metellus Balearicus; T. Quinctius Flamininus	Roman consul 122 BC; With: Gnaeus Domitius Ahenobarbus	Succeeded by Lucius Opimius; Q. Fabius Maximus Allobrogicus
