= Gaius Pomptinus =

Roman politician and military officer (b. 103 BCE)

Gaius Pomptinus (born 103 BC) was a Roman politician and military officer. He was a legate under Marcus Licinus Crassus during the Third Servile War. During his term as praetor in 63 BC, he played a role in suppressing the Catilinarian conspiracy: he intercepted the communications between Catiline's urban conspirators and the Allobroges on the Mulvian bridge, giving the incriminating letters recovered to Cicero. After his praetorship he served as governor in Transalpine Gaul, possibly pro praetore, fighting the Allobroges. He may have remained in Gaul until 59 since his intended successor, the Quintus Caecilius Metellus Celer who was consul in 60, died before taking up the post. If he stayed there until the end of 59 he would have been Caesar's direct predecessor.

One of the plebeian tribunes of 59 BC, Publius Vatinius, attempted to disrupt recognition of his successes. Regardless, Pomptinus was able to retain his imperium so that in 54, with the support of then-praetor and former subordinate Servius Sulpicius Galba as well as then-consul Appius Claudius Pulcher, he triumphed for his victories in Gaul. Afterwards he joined Cicero's staff in Cilicia from 51 to 50, playing an important role in the military side of operations there.

== Bibliography ==
- Broughton, Thomas Robert Shannon (1952). The magistrates of the Roman republic. Vol. 2. New York: American Philological Association.
- Fundling, Jorg (2006). "Pomptinus". Brill's New Pauly. doi:10.1163/1574-9347_bnp_e1004000.
