= Aimé Bocquet =

French historian and archaeologist

- Born: 28 May 1929; Grenoble, France
- Died: 3 December 2017 (aged 92); Grenoble, France
- Citizenship: French
- Occupation: Prehistorian

Aimé Bocquet (28 May 1929 – 3 December 2017) was a French prehistorian who specialised in the Alpine region.

== Biography ==
Aimé Bocquet was born on 28 May 1929 in Grenoble, Isère. After completing his secondary education in Grenoble, he studied dentistry at the Faculty of Medicine in Lyon, obtaining his qualification in 1953. He then succeeded his father as a dentist in Grenoble, a profession he would maintain in parallel with his archaeological endeavors.

In 1958, Bocquet co-founded the Centre de documentation de la Préhistoire alpine (CDPA) in Grenoble, serving as its president. The CDPA remained active until its closure in 2005.

Collaborating with geologist Jacques Debelmas at the Institut Dolomieu in Grenoble, he completed a doctoral thesis in paleontology and prehistory, focused on the pre- and protohistory of the Isère region (L’Isère pré- et protohistorique), which he defended in 1968. His thesis was subsequently published in Gallia Préhistoire in 1969.

From 1972 to 1982, Bocquet lectured at the University of Grenoble and later at the University of Chambéry (1990–1995). Between 1971 and 1989, he served as a special advisor at the Musée Savoisien in Chambéry, where he helped reorganize the Bronze Age collections from lakeside archaeological sites around Lac du Bourget.

He died on 3 December 2017 in Grenoble.

== Works ==
- À Charavines il y a 5000 ans, 1989
- Les Âges des métaux dans les Alpes, 1976
- Balazuc : village médiéval du Vivarais : l'histoire, les hommes, les pierres, 2011
- Catalogue des collections préhistoriques et protohistoriques, 1970
- Congrès national des sociétés historiques et scientifiques (119; 1994; Amiens). Section de pré- et protohistoire
- Espaces physiques, espaces sociaux dans l'analyse interne des sites du néolithique à l'âge du fer, 1997
- Hannibal chez les Allobroges : 218 avant Jésus-Christ : la grande traversée des Alpes, 2009
- La Nécropole protohistorique de Saint-Paul-de-Varces, par Aimé Bocquet... D'après les travaux du Spéléo-groupe du Club alpin français de Grenoble, 1963
