= Gnaeus Domitius Ahenobarbus (consul 122 BC) =

Roman senator, consul and general (165-c. 104)

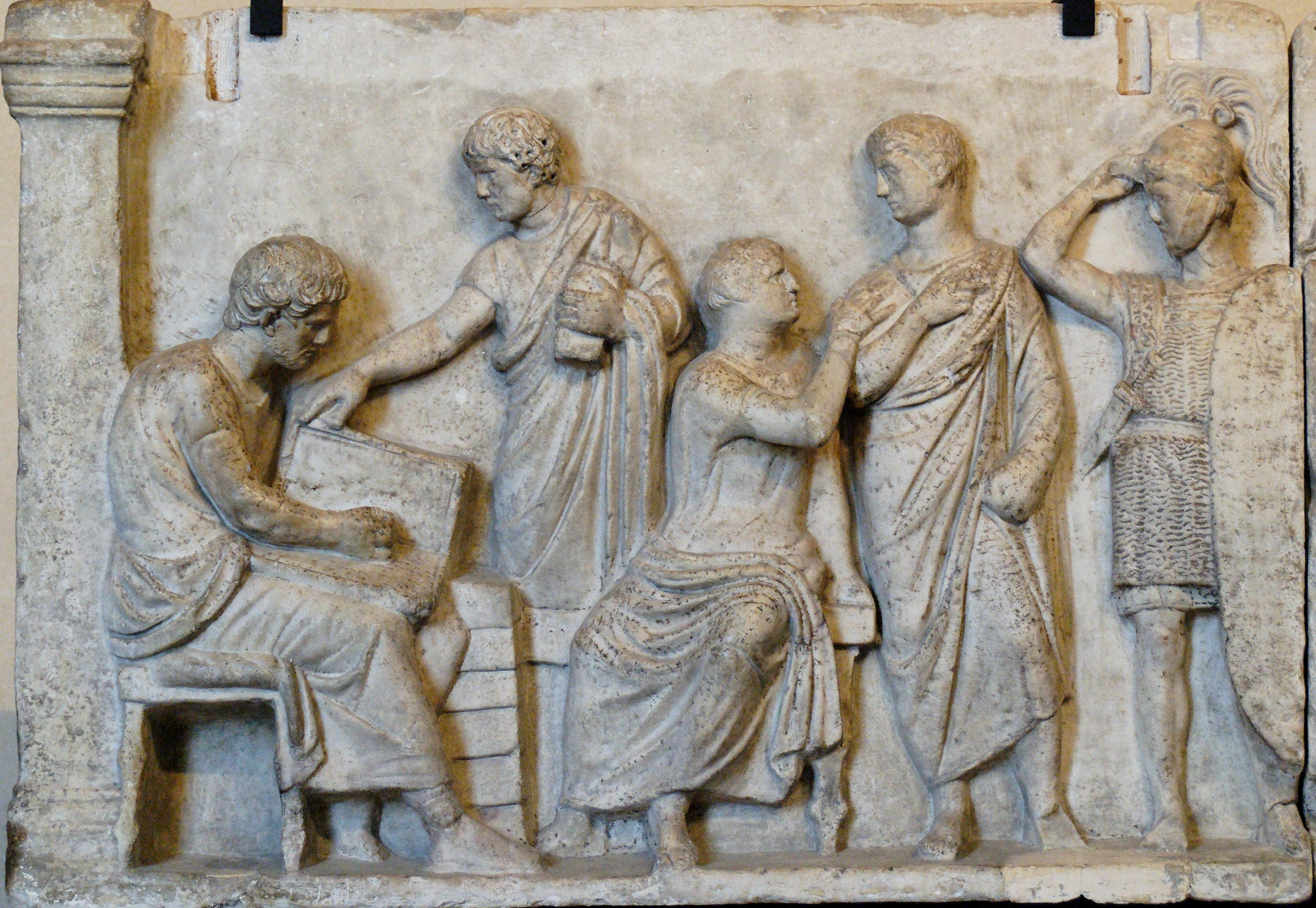
- A censor conducting a Roman census on the Altar in the Temple of Neptune that is often attributed to Domitius.

Roman consul
- Preceded by: Q. Caecilius Metellus with Ti. Quinctius Flaminius
- Succeeded by: Lucius Opimius with Q. Fabius Maximus

Personal details
- Children: Gnaeus Domitius Ahenobarbus (consul 96 BC); Lucius Domitius Ahenobarbus (consul 94 BC)
- Occupation: Politician, general

Military service
- Allegiance: Roman Empire
- Commands: Governor of Transalpine Gaul
- Battles/wars: Battle of Vindalium

Gnaeus Domitius Ahenobarbus (d. ca. 104 BC) was a Roman general and senator who served as consul in 122 BC. He led a campaign to conquer southern Gaul against the Allobroges together with his successor Quintus Fabius Maximus Allobrogicus. Domitius was active in the early development of southern Roman Gaul, establishing the first Roman colony at Colonia Narbon Martius, and sponsored projects such as the Via Domitia connecting Italy to Spain through southern Gaul. He was probably also the sponsor of the Altar of Domitius Ahenobarbus in the Temple of Neptune in Rome. Ahenobarbus was censor in 115 BC and became pontifex at an unknown date before dying c. 104 BC.

== Background and family ==
He was a member of the prestigious Domitii Ahenobarbi, a plebeian family. His father was Gnaeus Domitius Ahenobarbus, who served as consul suffect in 162 BC. His grandfather Gnaeus Domitius Ahenobarbus was consul in 192 BC.

He was survived by two sons, Gnaeus Domitius Ahenobarbus (consul in 96 BC) and Lucius Domitius Ahenobarbus (consul in 94 BC). He was the grandfather of Lucius Domitius Ahenobarbus (consul in 54 BC). It is from this line Domitius is an ancestor of the last Julio-Claudian emperor Nero (AD 54 - 68), born Lucius Domitius Ahenobarbus.

== Career ==
In the 120s BC Rome had become increasingly active in Mediterranean Gaul, launching three separate campaigns into the region in the years immediately before Ahenobarbus' consulship: in 125 to protect Rome's ally Massalia from the Salluvii, in 124 BC Rome seized the capital of the Salluvii (the city of the Gauls near the oppidum of Entremont, near modern Aix-en-Provence), and in 123 BC again defeating the Salluvii and establishing a permanent garrison for Roman troops at a nearby place hence called Aquae Sextiae (modern Aix-en-Provence).

The following year, 122 BC, begins the consulship of Domitius in which he led the campaign against the Allobroges. The Allobroges did harm to the pro-Roman Aedui tribe and harbored a leader of the Salluvii, King Teutomalius, who escaped the destruction of his city and enslavement by the Romans from the previous year. Along his way to the Allobroges, Domitius met with an ambassador of King Bituitus of the powerful Arverni. The discussions did not go in Rome's favor, however, and the Arverni joined the Allobroges against Rome in 121 BC.

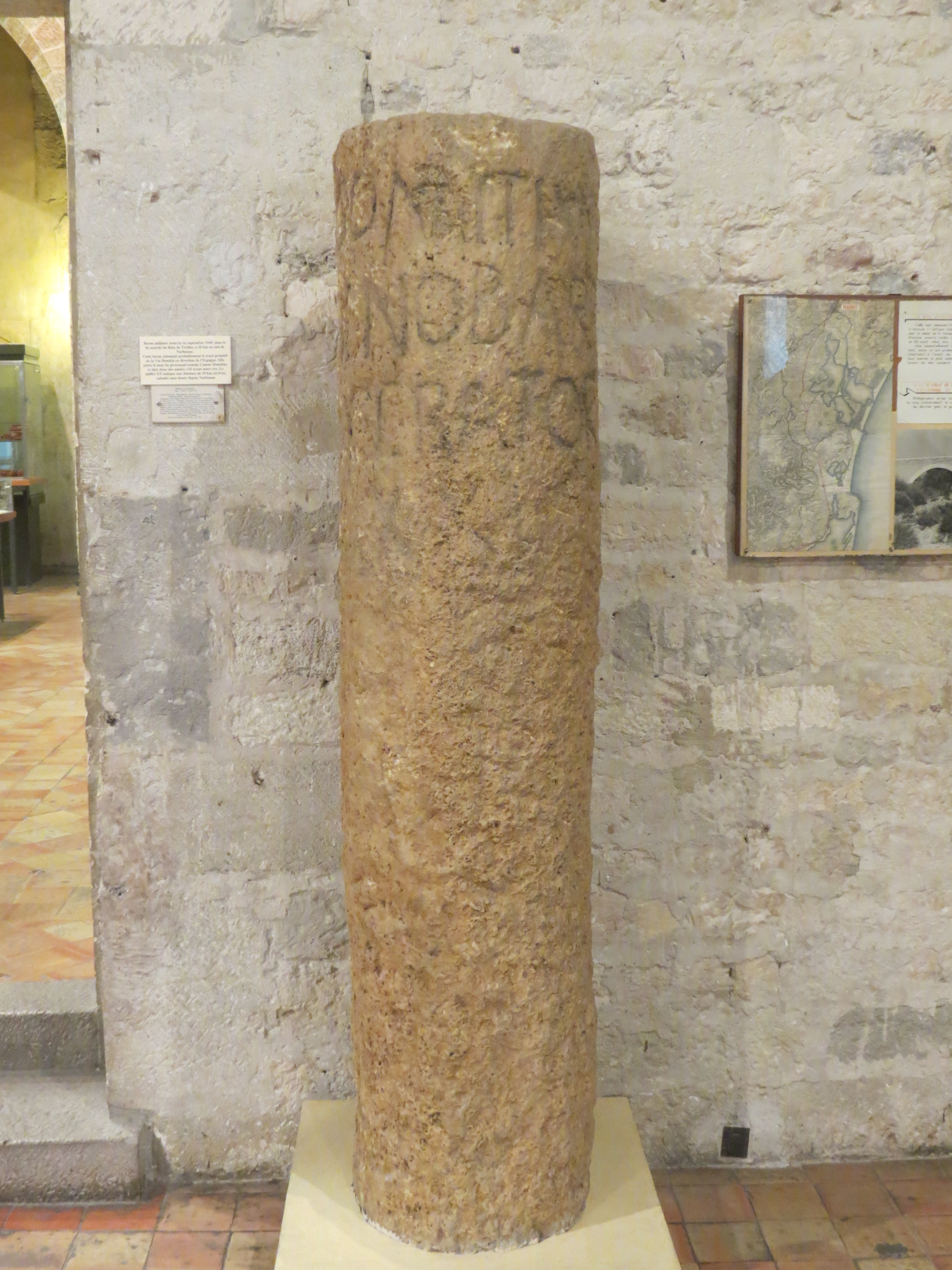
Milestone inscription of Cn(aeus) Domitius Cn(aei) f(ilius) / Ahenobarbus / imperator / XX from Narbo Martius, one of the first Latin inscriptions in Gaul c.118 BC.

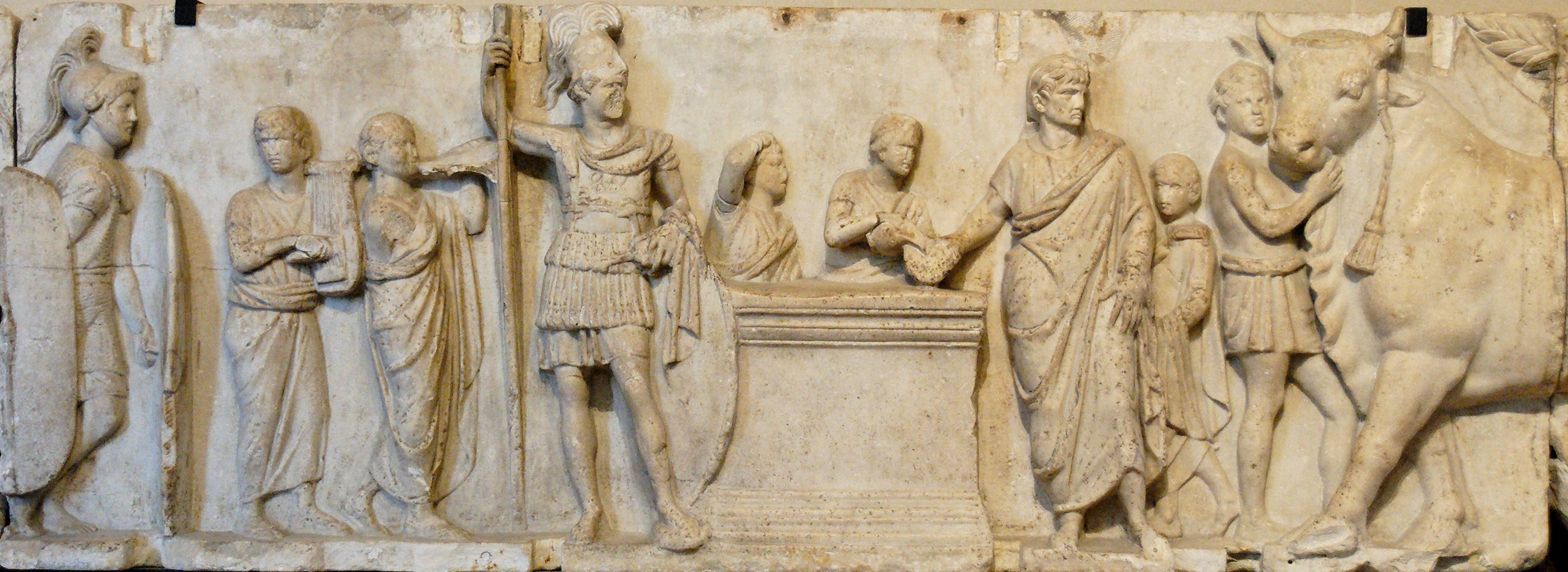
A bas-relief from the Altar of Domitius Ahenobarbus.

Domitius was no longer consul, but led his army anyway as proconsul. At the conflux of the Rhône and Sulga he defeated the Allobroges at the Battle of Vindalium. At the same time, consul Quintus Fabius Maximus Allobrogicus led another force to the north near modern Valence at the convergence of the Rhône and Isère rivers where they achieved a resounding victory over a significantly larger force of Celts, suffering minimal casualties. Rome's victory was complete enough; there wouldn't be another campaign in the area for two decades afterward.

Via Domitia in purple.

Domitius took Bituitus and sent him off to a prison in Rome out of jealousy of Fabius as to prevent the slain enemy commander from being paraded in Rome for Fabius' triumph. For his victory at Vindalium he was awarded a triumph and the title imperator, as is Maximus for the victory at Isère. There are two facts about the Senate's reaction to their victories that stands out. Firstly, Fabius was awarded a triumphal agnomen "Allobrogicus" for his victory, whereas Domitius was not. Secondly, Fabius conducted his triumphal procession first. This is unusual considering Domitius was the senior of the two and would normally go first in such a procession. The triumph in 120 BC marks the end of his three-year command over Transalpine Gaul.

Having completed the conquests of what is now in western Languedoc, Domitius established the first Roman colony in Gaul called Colonia Narbo Martius (Narbonne) in 118 BC. It is also around this time he constructed the Via Domitia, a road connecting Italy to Rome provinces in Spain. The road is named after himself. It was built along an ancient trading road, crossing the Alps by one of the easiest passages, the Col de Montgenèvre.

As censor in 115 BC, he expelled thirty-two senators from the Roman Senate.

Domitius was made pontifex at an uncertain date and later died around 104 BC.

== Bibliography ==
=== Primary sources ===
- Cicero, Pro Cluentio
- Cicero, Pro Fonteio
- Livy, Ab Urbe Condita Libri
- Suetonius, De vita Caesarum

=== Secondary sources ===
- Brennan, T. Corey (2000), The Praetorship in the Roman Republic: Volume 2: 122 to 49 BC, ISBN 9780195114607
- Broughton, T. Robert S. (1951), he Magistrates of the Roman Republic : Volume I, 509 B.C. - 100 B.C., ISBN 978-0891307068
- Cooley, Alison (2012), The Cambridge Manual of Latin Epigraphy, ISBN 9780521840262
- Hazel, John (2002), Who's Who in the Roman World, ISBN 9781134592524
- Luley, Benjamin P. (2020), Continuity and Rupture in Roman Mediterranean Gaul, ISBN 9781789255690
- Torelli, Mario (1992), Typology & Structure of Roman Historical Reliefs, ISBN 9780472081714

Preceded by Titus Quinctius Flaminius, Quintus Caecilius Metellus Balearicus	Consul of the Roman Republic with Gaius Fannius; 122 BC	Succeeded by Quintus Fabius Maximus Allobrogicus, Lucius Opimius
