= Quintus Caecilius Metellus Balearicus =

2nd-century BCE Roman statesman and general

Quintus Caecilius Metellus Balearicus (born c. 170 BC) was a Roman statesman and general who was elected consul for the year 123 BC.

== Career ==
Quintus Caecilius Metellus was the eldest son of Quintus Caecilius Metellus Macedonicus, the Roman consul of 143 BC, and a member of the plebeian gens Caecilia. It is suspected that he served under his father in Hispania Citerior during 143-142 BC. By 126 BC, he had been elected to the office of Praetor. He was then elected to the consulship in 123 BC, serving alongside Titus Quinctius Flamininus. During his consulship, he was awarded the command of the campaign against the pirates of the Balearic Islands. His campaign continued into 122 BC, and when his consulship ended, he was granted a proconsular command.

By 121 BC, he had defeated the pirates and conquered Mallorca and Menorca, the Balearics, for which he earned his cognomen Balearicus and the honours of a Triumph. In the aftermath of the victory, he established at Palma and Pollentia two colonies of 3,000 Romans from Iberia. In 120 BC, he was appointed Censor, during which time he and his censorial colleague probably reappointed Publius Cornelius Lentulus as Princeps senatus.

== Family ==
He was the father of:

- Quintus Caecilius Metellus Nepos
- Caecilia Metella, possible wife of Appius Claudius Pulcher. (Note: Caecilia Metella was the name of all women of the Caecilii Metelli.)

== See also ==
- Caecilia gens

== Sources ==
- Broughton, T. Robert S., The Magistrates of the Roman Republic, Vol I (1952)
- Broughton, T. Robert S., The Magistrates of the Roman Republic, Vol III (1986)
- Smith, William, Dictionary of Greek and Roman Biography and Mythology, Vol II (1867)

Preceded by Gaius Cassius Longinus; Gaius Sextius Calvinus	Roman consul 123 BC; With: Titus Quinctius Flamininus	Succeeded by Gnaeus Domitius Ahenobarbus; Gaius Fannius
