= Quintus Fabius Maximus Allobrogicus =

2nd-century BC Roman statesman and general

Quintus Fabius Maximus Allobrogicus, was a Roman statesman and general who was elected consul in 121 BC. During his consulship he fought against the Arverni and the Allobroges whom he defeated in 120 BC. He was awarded a triumph and the agnomen Allobrogicus for his victory over the Gauls.

== Career ==
Fabius Maximus Allobrogicus was the son of Quintus Fabius Maximus Aemilianus, the Roman consul of 145 BC, and a member of the patrician gens Fabia. (Note: Allobrogicus was a member of the gens Fabia through the adoption of his father; his paternal grandfather was Lucius Aemilius Paullus Macedonicus.) His first appearance was during the elections for quaestor in 134 BC; he was recommended to the voters as a candidate by his biological uncle Scipio Aemilianus, and after Allobrogicus was elected, Scipio took him as his quaestor to Hispania Citerior where they fought in the Second Numantine War. While there, Allobrogicus was placed in charge of 4,000 volunteers.

By 124 BC, he had been elected to the office of praetor, since in 123 BC, he was appointed propraetor (governor) of one of the Hispanias (Citerior or Ulterior). Whilst there, he was censured by the Senate, following a motion by Gaius Gracchus, for extorting gifts of grain from a Spanish town. Then in 121 BC, he was elected consul alongside Lucius Opimius. During his consulship, he campaigned in Gallia Transalpina (in the modern day Auvergne and Rhône-Alpes regions) with Gnaeus Domitius Ahenobarbus against the Gallic tribes of the Allobroges and Arverni. After his consulship expired, he replaced Domitius Ahenobarbus as proconsul in Gaul (120 BC), during which time he completed the defeat of the Allobroges and Arverni. For this he was awarded the honour of a triumph and given the agnomen Allobrogicus. The triumph he held was famous for its spectacle, including the captive Arvernian king Bituitus in his silver battle armor. From the plunder of the Auvergne, Fabius erected the Fornix Fabianus (121 BC) crossing the Via Sacra at the Forum Romanum, placing a statue of himself on top of the arch.

In 113 BC, he may have been the Quintus Fabius who was the leader of an embassy sent to Crete to help end some internal disputes between various cities on the island. Then in 108 BC, either he or Quintus Fabius Maximus Eburnus was appointed to the office of Censor.

He was a known orator and a man of letters. Upon the death of his blood uncle Scipio Aemilianus in 129 BC, Fabius presented a banquet to the citizenry of Rome and pronounced the funeral oration of the deceased general. He had at least one son, also named Quintus Fabius Maximus Allobrogicus, who was notorious for his vices. His grandson was Quintus Fabius Maximus.

== Sources ==
- Broughton, T. Robert S. (1952). The Magistrates of the Roman Republic. Vol. I.
- Smith, William (1867). Dictionary of Greek and Roman Biography and Mythology. Vol. II.
- Keegan, John & Wheatcroft, Andrew (2001). Who's Who in Military History. Routledge. ISBN 9780415260398.

Preceded by Gnaeus Domitius Ahenobarbus and Gaius Fannius	Consul of the Roman Republic with Lucius Opimius; 121 BC	Succeeded by Gaius Papirius Carbo and Publius Manilius
