= Bituitus =

King of the Arverni

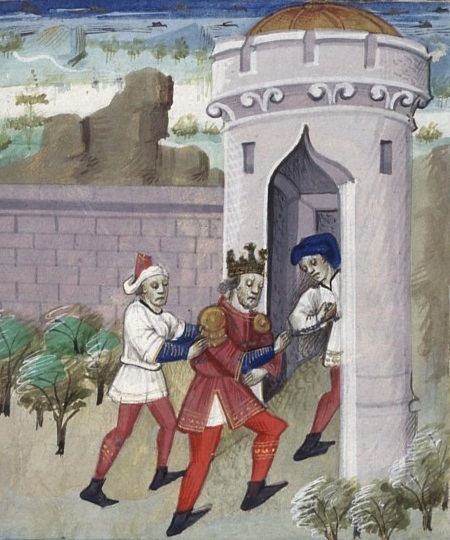
Bituit, roi des auvergnats, mis en prison, miniature médiévale issue du De casibus de Boccace. XV^{e} siècle, BnF.

Bituitus (fl. 2nd century BCE) was a king of the Arverni, a Gaulish tribe living in what is now the Auvergne region of France. The Arverni were a powerful opponent of the Roman Republic during the 3rd and 2nd centuries under the leadership of Luernius, the father of Bituitus. In 121 BCE, Bituitus was defeated by the Roman general Fabius Maximus, ending the power of the Arverni in Mediterranean Gaul, or present-day southern France. The defeat of the Arverni resulted in the establishment of the Roman province of Gallia Narbonensis.

== History ==
In 121 BC, the Roman proconsul Domitius Ahenobarbus undertook a war against the Allobroges, who allied with the Arverni under Bituitus. These Gallic tribes were defeated near the town of Vindalium, the current French town of Bédarrides. After this defeat, the Allobroges and Arverni made preparations to re-enter battle with the Romans. Bituitus again took the field with a large army. Where the Isère river meets the river Rhone near current-day Valence in the south of France, the consul Fabius Maximus, the grandson of Paullus, met them in battle in the autumn of 121 BC. The Romans were greatly outnumbered, yet managed to gain a complete victory. It was estimated that 120,000 of Bituitus's army fell in the battle.

Following his defeat, Bituitus was taken prisoner and sent to Rome, where he was sentenced by the senate to exile in Alba Fucens, one of three foreign kings known to have been held there. Bituitus' son, Congonnetiacus, was also captured, and possibly held with him at Alba. It was the last time that a foreign king was detained at Alba, and throughout the rest of the Late Republican period, kings are known to have been detained at Rome, often in the homes of high-ranking officials, and to have agitated actively in political affairs.

Fabius was awarded the honour of a triumph and given the agnomen Allobrogicus. Unlike the Arverni, who retained independence after the war, the Allobroges were brought under Roman rule at this time. Bituitus, wearing his silver ceremonial armor, was paraded at Fabius's triumph. From the plunder of the Auvergne, Fabius erected his victory arch, the Fornix Fabianus along the Via Sacra, and adorned it with a statue of himself.

Bituitus is the last known king of the Arverni, and later sources, such as Julius Caesar's war commentaries, indicate that they were afterwards ruled by an oligarchy or council analogous to the Roman Senate.
