= Viennensis =

Roman province

Viennensis Gallia Viennensis (Latin)
- Roman province of Roman Empire (c. AD 314 - 395), Western Roman Empire (c. AD 395–476)
- c. AD 314 – AD 476
- Province of Viennensis, c. 400 AD
- Capital: Vienna (modern-day Vienne)
- Historical era: Late antiquity
  - Reform of Diocletian (Tetrarchy structure): c. AD 314
  - The expansion of the province's territory to encompass the tribal lands of the Allobroges, Segovellauni, Helvii, Tricastini, Vocontii, and Cavari.: c. AD 4th century
  - The division of administrative boundaries into two through reorganization: c. AD 5th century
  - Fall of the Western Roman Empire: c. AD 476
Preceded by
Gallia Narbonensis
Succeeded by
Kingdom of the Burgundians
Francia
Gallia Viennense I
Gallia Viennense II
- Today part of: France

Viennensis or Gallia Viennensis was a Late Roman province that derived its name from its capital Vienna (modern day Vienne, Isère), a Roman city, first located in Gallia Narbonensis.

Vienna was first given the rank of colonia by Julius Caesar, after his Gallic campaigns in 58 BCE and 52 BCE, as a colony of veterans (Colonia Julia Viennensium); Augustus reinstated the rights after the romanized Allobroges had revolted which led to a temporary loss of the title; Caligula eventually named it Colonia Julia Augusta Florentia Viennensium in 40 CE.

During the reorganization of the provinces under the tetrachy of Diocletian in the early 4th century, Vienna then became the capital of the province of Viennensis with the tribes of the Allobrogi, Segovellauni, Helvii, Tricastini, Vocontii and Cavari.

In the 5th century the province was further divided into Gallia Viennense I, with its capital Vienne, and Gallia Viennense II, with its capital Arles.

== See also ==
- Septem Provinciae
- Lugdunum
- Augusta Treverorum
