= Jonchères =

- Commune
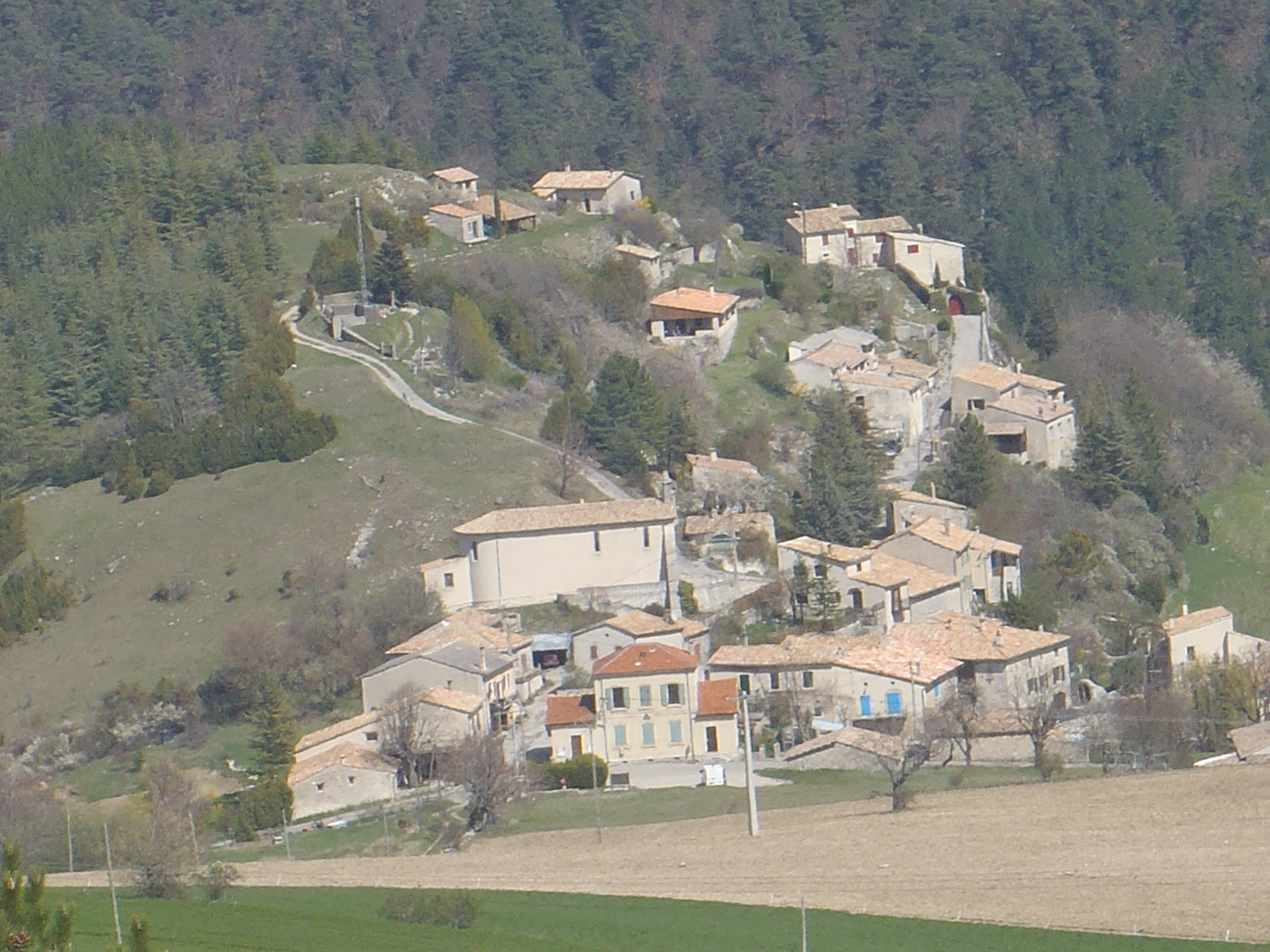
- A general view of Jonchères
- Location of Jonchères
- Location within France Location within Auvergne-Rhône-Alpes
- Coordinates: 44°34′22″N 5°24′21″E
- Country: France
- Region: Auvergne-Rhône-Alpes
- Department: Drôme
- Arrondissement: Die
- Canton: Le Diois
- Intercommunality: Diois

Government
  - Mayor (2020–2026): Yann Fontaine
- Area^{1}: 16.68 km^{2} (6.44 sq mi)
- Elevation: 910 m (2,990 ft)
- Highest elevation: 1,560 m (5,120 ft)
- Lowest elevation: 719 m (2,359 ft)
- Population (2023): 27
  - Density: 1.6/km^{2} (4.2/sq mi)
- Time zone: UTC+01:00 (CET)
  - Summer (DST): UTC+02:00 (CEST)
- INSEE/Postal code: 26152 /26310
- ^{1} French Land Register data, which excludes lakes, ponds, glaciers > 1 km^{2} (0.386 sq mi or 247 acres) and river estuaries.

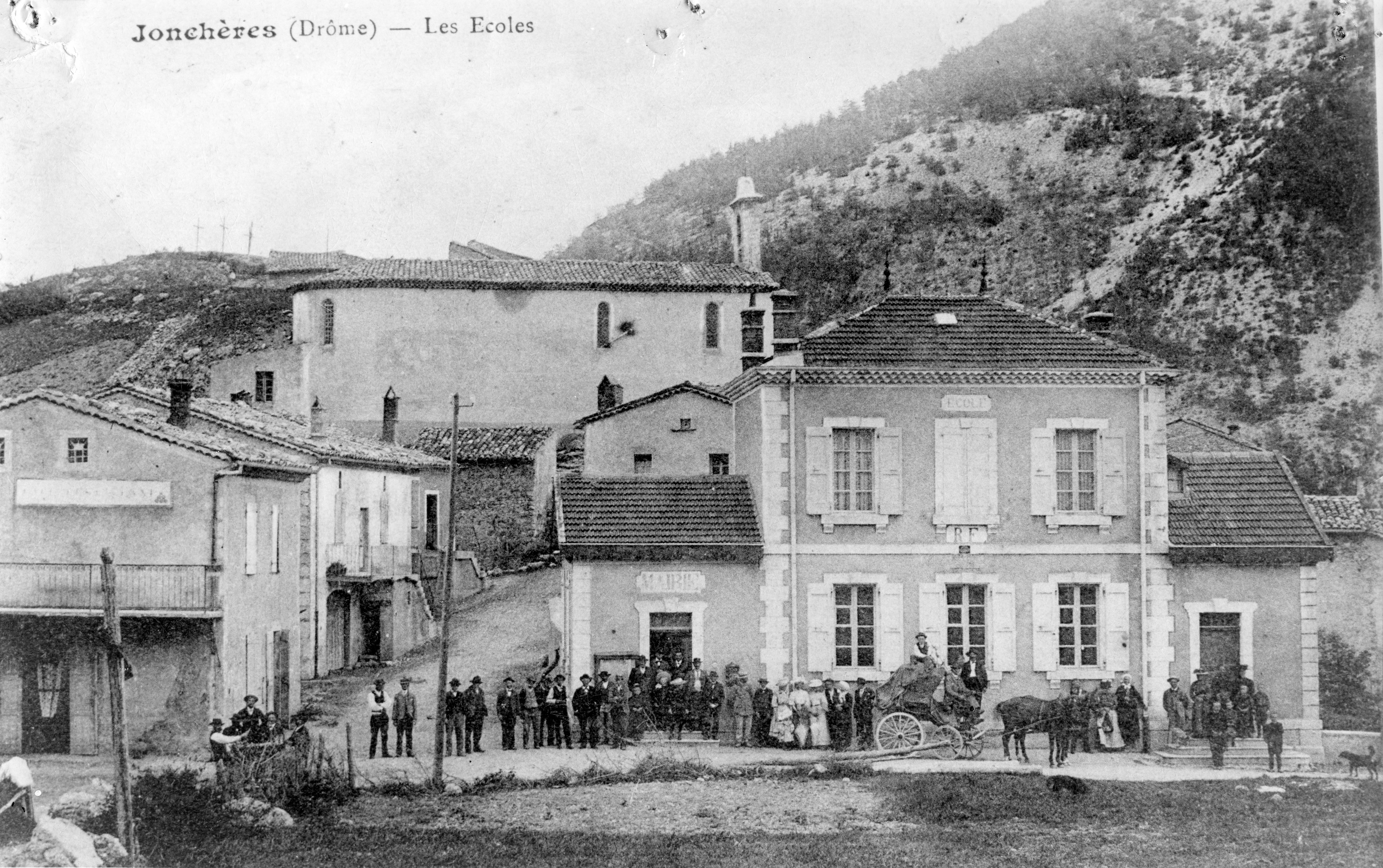
The village of Jonchères (Drôme) in the 1900s

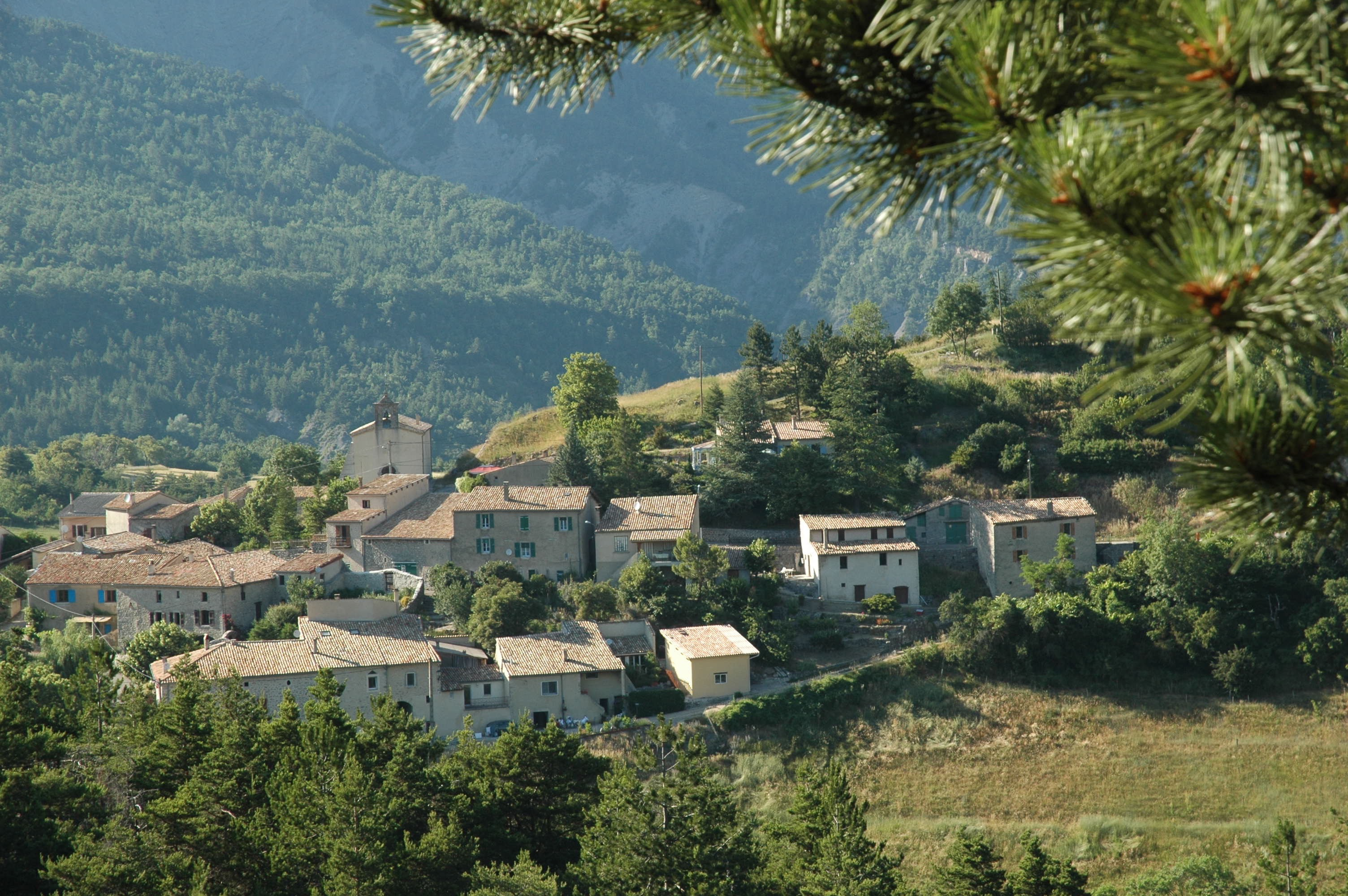
General view of Jonchères in 2011

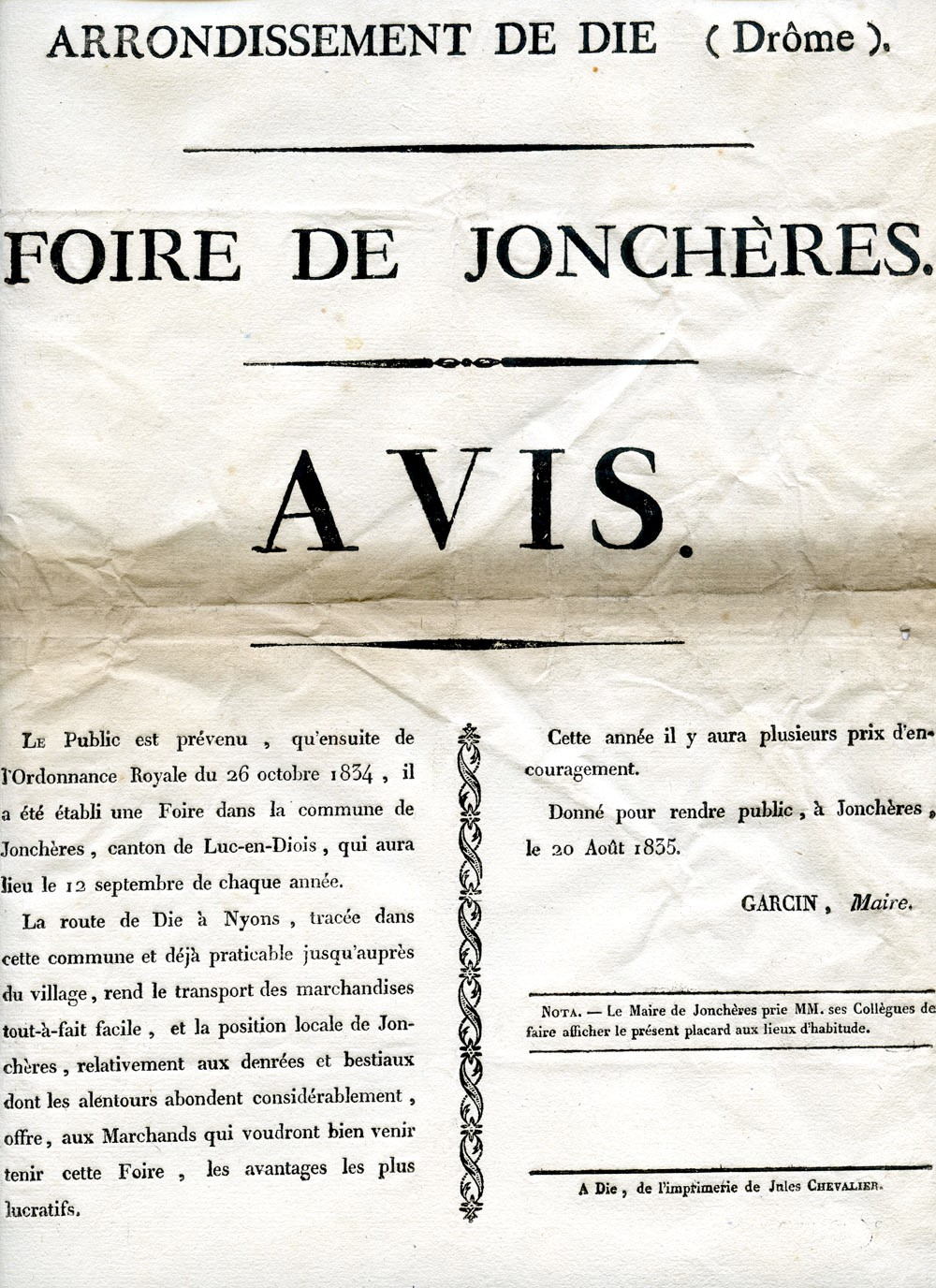
Poster informing the inhabitants about the establishment of a fair in the commune of Jonchères in application of the Royal ordonnance of October 26, 1834

Jonchères (French pronunciation: [ʒɔ̃ʃɛʁ]; Occitan: Junchèras) is a commune in the Drôme department in southeastern France, in the region of Auvergne-Rhône Alpes. It is located in the Béous valley, an affluent of the left bank of the Drôme river. The village is on a small winding road that climbs from the town of Luc-en-Diois 8 kilometres (5.0 miles) away, toward Prémol Pass. The village is at an altitude of 911 metres (2,989 feet), surrounded by mountains thick with fir and pine. The closest nearby villages are Poyols, Bellegarde-en-Diois and Volvent. The sub-prefecture is 25 kilometres (16 miles) away.

The name Jonchères comes from the Latin joncus, meaning rushes. The word jonchère in French means area of rushes, the grass-like marsh plants of the family Juncaceae. The stem of the rush is used in making chair seats, baskets, mats etc.

== History ==
In 1789, it was specified in the census report that the number of inhabitants varied annually according to the number of servants and shepherds. Included in the report was the information that most of the illnesses recorded in Jonchères were due to malnutrition of its inhabitants most of whom were born poor. At the time, wheat, rye, vegetables and a little hay were grown, but no other crops because of the difficulties of watering. And there were high taxes to pay to the lords and bishops of Die.

In the mid 1800s, Jonchères had an annual fair on September 12. In 2017, a Jonchères resident found in a flea market an original document from 1835 announcing this fair. A Royal Ordinance of October 26, 1834 established the fair in the commune of Jonchères, canton of Luc-en-Diois, which was to take place every year on September 12, beginning in 1835. In the document, it was explained that the new route from Die to Nyons was now passable, facilitating the transport of merchandise, and that the local position of Jonchères, relative to goods and animals plentiful in the area, would provide lucrative advantages to any and all merchants who wished to participate in the fair. It was also announced that for the first year of the fair there would be “many awards of encouragement.” The document is dated August 20, 1835 and signed by the Jonchères Mayor, Monsieur Garcin who asked his colleagues to widely distribute the document. The document was printed at the Jules Chevalier printing press in the town of Die.

== Economy ==
The main products of the village in the 1800s were rye, oats, walnuts and grazing of animals.

In the 1900s, the farmers began to grow lavender on their fields. The last lavender field was abandoned in the early 2000s. Lavender is still a main crop in the Drôme region.

By 2017, only one farmer remained in the village with his flock of sheep and goats. There are no shops in the village. The former communal oven was renovated into a small pizzeria-restaurant open only during vacations. At least half of the houses of the village are now owned by people outside the village who use them as vacation homes.

== Monuments and patrimony ==
Near Jonchères (east of the town of Luc-en-Diois) is an immense rock fall from a cliff edge that broke off some 400 years ago. The place is called "The Claps" and its "Saut de la Drôme" or waterfall resulting from the rock fall is listed as a "national patrimony" of France.

Beautiful hiking is possible from Jonchères in all directions: the national Claps forest, the mountains of Volvent, Montenier, Proloubeau, Boutarinard, Premol Pass. (964 m. altitude)

== Population ==
Historical population
Year	Pop.	±% p.a.
1968	39	—
1975	50	+3.61%
1982	37	−4.21%
1990	50	+3.84%
1999	35	−3.89%
2007	37	+0.70%
2012	33	−2.26%
2017	28	−3.23%
2023	27	−0.60%
Source: INSEE

The highest population recorded in Jonchères was in 1836 with 339 inhabitants. Since then, the population has steadily deceased: 164 in 1901, 69 in 1936, 50 in 1975.

== See also ==
- Communes of the Drôme department
