= Industrial history of Lyon =

The city of Lyon, situated in the Auvergne-Rhône-Alpes region of France, is the second wealthiest city in France, preceding Paris, and one of the most economically important cities in Europe. It is economically one of the largest centers for banking, pharmaceutical, chemical, and biotech industries in Europe. Lyon's strong economical presence is nothing new, as it has been at the forefront of Europe's economic industries dating back to the Roman Empire. The industrialization of Lyon came about in 4 different phases, first with the French Renaissance period of the 15th century, then the silk industries in the 18th and 19th centuries, followed by World War I, and more recently with the advanced technologies of the 20th and 21st centuries.

== Beginning of Lyon's economy ==
Situated on the Rhône River and in the Rhône river valley, Lyon has played a crucial role in uniting the coasts of France with its interior. The Romans were the first to recognize this around 120 BC, later founding the Gallia Viennensis colony in 51 BC. The ideal location of the city saw it to be the center of trade for many industries in western Europe.

=== Lugdunum ===
The economic development of the city of Lyon began early in the Roman Empire, when Lyon was known as Lugdunum. In 27 BC, Lugdunum became the headquarters of the Roman empire for the 3 provinces of Gaul. It thus became the administrative, cultural, and commercial center of the Gauls in the Roman Empire. A network of Roman roads known as the Via Agrippa helped connect the Atlantic Ocean, the English Channel, the North-East coast of Gaul, and Gaul's South-East to Lugdunum, increasing trade and influence in the city. France's major roadways today still follow the same patterns as the Via Agrippa roadways. Along with its strategic location between the Saône and Rhône rivers, Lugdunum quickly rose as an important center for commerce in the Roman empire.

=== Silk trade of 15th–19th centuries ===
Starting in the late 15th century, Lyon once again became a major hub for trade in France. Much was traded in the city, including spices, knives, weapons, and most importantly silk. Silk played a large historical and monetary role in the development of Lyon's economy. Introduced to Lyon in 1466, when Louis XI of France set up the first silk manufacture, the large demand for luxury silk goods by the French aristocracy led Lyon to become one of the worlds major producers of silk. in 1540, King [Francois I] granted Lyon the monopoly of silk manufacturing, ensuring that all silk goods produced in Italy or Asia traveling the Silk Roads would pass through Lyon's warehouses. In the 17th century, it was estimated that the city contained more than 10,000 silk looms, cementing Lyon as the global centre for silk weaving. In 1667 Jean-Baptiste Colbert, the superintended of finance to Louis XIV regulated the quality implications of silk production, and tariffs to be paid to workers. Thanks to these regulations, the social advancements and mastery of silk production helped Lyon become the worldwide capital of Silk in the late 17th century. In 1801, Joseph Marie Jacquard invented a mechanical loom that rapidly industrialized the process of producing silk.

==== Hinderances of the Silk Industry ====
The Edict of Fontainebleau (1685) which revoked the Edict of Nantes issued in 1598, forced the Calvinist Protestants, also known as the Huguenots, of France to flee the country for fear of religious persecution. Many of these Huguenots were skilled workers within the silk industry, and their persecution saw a drastic decline in the production of silk. However, the Huguenots greatly participated in the development of the silk industries in Germany, Great Britain, Italy, the Netherlands, and Switzerland. The end of Louis XIV's rule also posed a great threat to the silk industries of Lyon. The end of his reign marked a period of war and poverty. Without royal orders for silk, and with an impoverished nation the demand for silk greatly dropped, greatly damaging the industry. The French Revolution proved to be the most damaging period for the silk industry. As thousands of French citizens were either guillotined or shot, much of the skilled labor in France disappeared. Most of the drawings, designs and fabric samples in Lyon were destroyed, leaving hundreds of years of Lyon's history to be no more. As many fled the country, the workforce for the silk industry declined by almost 90%.

=== Printing ===
In 1440, German innovator Johannes Gutenberg invented the modern printing press; with moveable characters in lead alloy which allowed for texts to be printed much faster and in larger quantities than its prior wooden ancestor. With the introduction of this new technology, printing industries thus emerged in France in the late 15th century, with the first 50 printing houses in Lyon opening in 1472. In this year, Bartélemy Buyer and Guillaume Leroy began publishing legal reference works for the international market, as well as illustrated volumes of religious popularization, and many books on chivalry and medical treaties. Barthélemy and Leroy made Lyon the focal point for the circulation of Venetian works throughout Europe. By the early 16th century, Lyon was the 3rd largest printing center in Europe (behind Paris and Venice), containing 181 printing houses. This led to a large influx in foreign printers coming from Germany, Italy, Spain, and other European nations. In 1519, the Great Company of Lyon's Booksellers was created to organize the many printing houses into an economic force. This enabled the town of Lyon to export its printing goods as far as Mexico, Peru, and the Far East. Economic welfare such as this led Lyon to be known as the European printing capital in 1550.

== Modern industries ==
=== 20th-century Lyon ===
The 20th century proved to be a crucial time for Lyon's economic development. Innovations such as the cinematographic camera marked the city as an important location for innovation and culture. This century saw a rise in Lyon's chemical and medical industries, as well as the rise of the French automotive industry.

==== Cinema ====
At the very end of the 19th century, Auguste and Louis Lumière began making a name for themselves in the world of film. The brothers began producing photographic plates in Lyon, a huge success, and by 1894 they were selling over 15 million plates a year. That same year, Antoine Lumière was invited to a showing of Thomas Edison's Kinetoscope, an early motion picture device which enabled viewers to see images through a peep hole. Antoine brought back news of this machine to his sons and asked them to enable the machine to both animate and project to be viewed by many at once. On February 13, 1895, Louis Lumiere created such a machine. The cinématographe was a small apparatus that enabled both photographing and projecting at 16 frames per second, which was quicker than Edison's kinetoscope and used less film. Their first screening took place on March 22, 1895, with a showing of Sortie des Usines Lumières à Lyon which is recognized as the first true motion picture ever created.

==== World War 1 ====
World War 1 saw a significant increase in French employment and forced many industries to make major changes in order to aid with the war effort. Companies like the Gillet firm, which was previously a construction company, became the war efforts' largest producer of gases, predominantly mustard gas. Automotive companies played the largest role in the war effort, with companies like Berliet (presently known as Renault ) whom originally produced trucks for the war, were licensed to produce shells and battle tanks; many of which were used in the Battle of Verdun. By the end of the war, Berliet saw their annual turnover increase fourfold. Overall, the war effort in Frances cities created nearly 2 million jobs, employing over 400,000 women.

=== Present-Day industries ===
In 2012, over 5.6 billion euros were invested into Lyon and the surrounding region for research and development in life-science and green technologies.

==== Chemical industries ====
Recognized as the birthplace of French chemical industries, Lyon still has a high density of chemically oriented companies. Over 500 companies in the petrochemical, mineral chemistry, analytics and organics fields reside in the city. The city has produced 2 Nobel Prize winners; Victor Grignard in 1912 for the Grignard reagent and Yves Chauvin in 2005 for his work in the area of olefin metathesis. Lyon also contains a "Chemical Valley", located in the South of the city which has over 30 companies in the chemical and energy sectors.

==== Biotech ====
In 2014, Lyon launched its Gerland Biodistrict. This district covers over 100 hectares, 30 public laboratories with around 2,750 researchers providing nearly 35,000 jobs in the city. This massive establishment was created in hopes to spur an influx of major biotech companies from around the world to move to Lyon by offering state of the art establishments and an access to students from some of France's Universities. The city has built many districts such as this one, including Biotech park.
