= Vordenses =

Gallic tribe

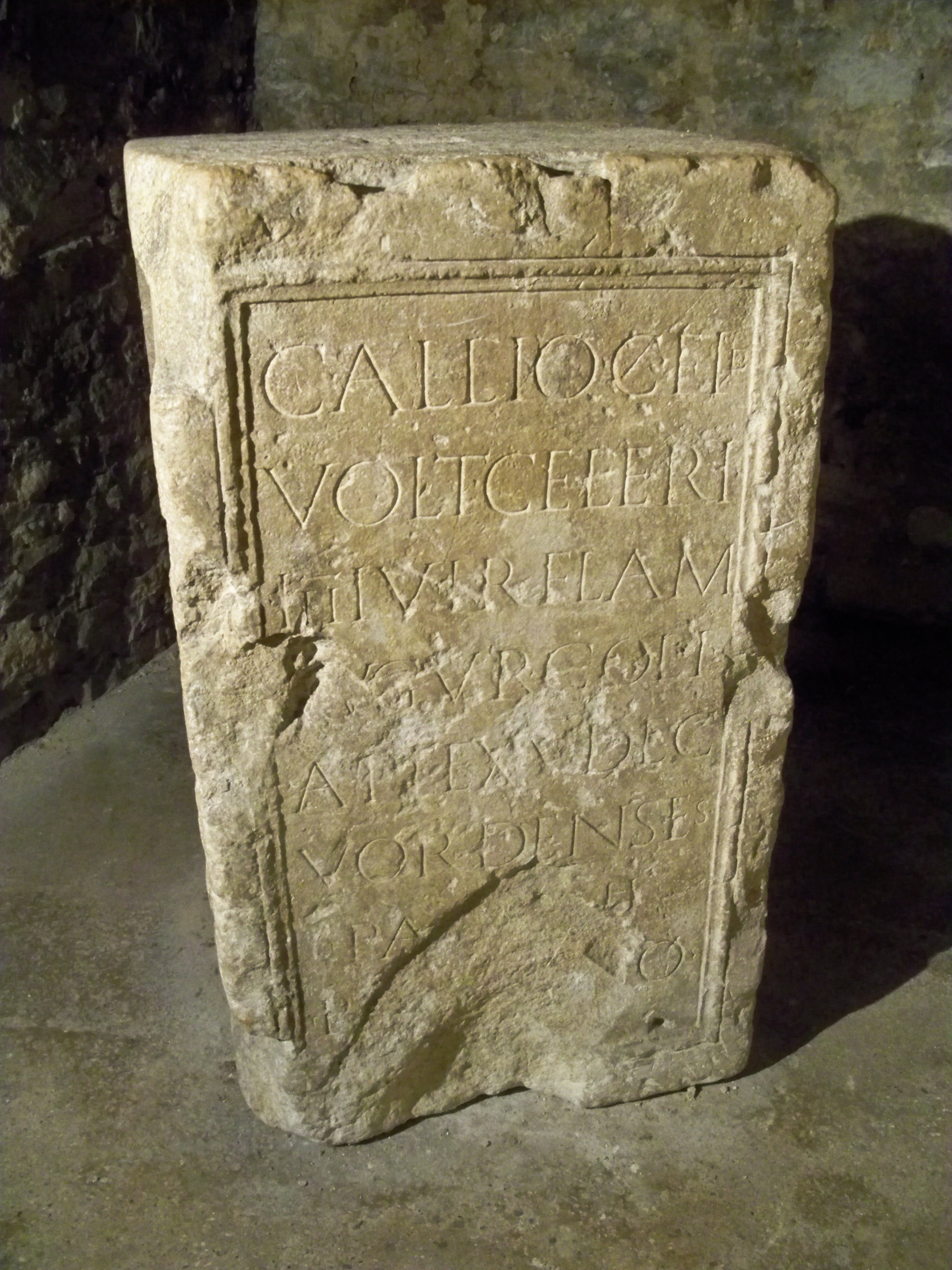
Inscription from Apt mentioning the Vordenses

The Vordenses were a Gallic tribe living in modern Vaucluse (southeastern France) during the Iron Age and the Roman period.

== Name ==
They are mentioned as Vordenses on an inscription.

The ethnonym Vordenses has been linked to Gordes (attested as Gorda in 1035 AD). Guy Barruol notes that the alternation between V- and G- is well attested in southern Gaulish toponymy, citing parallels such as Vappincum > Gap and Vardo > Gardon.

== Geography ==
The Vordenses probably occupied the region around Gordes, their chief town, within the territory of Apt. They did not constitute a people in their own right but rather formed a pagus. Gordes may have functioned as an administrative or religious centre, possibly a vicus of this pagus. According to Barruol, they were part the Albician confederation.

The Vordenses are attested on an inscription from Apt, in which the rural community (pagani) honours its patron, C. Allius Celer, reflecting the protective obligations expected of a patron toward such a community.

Inscription	Translation	Reference
C(aio) Allio C(ai) fil(io) | Volt(inia) Celeri | IIIIuir(o) flam(ini) | augur(i) col(onia) I(ulia) | Apt(a) ex V dec(uriis) | Vordenses | pa[ga]ni | pa(tro)no	To Gaius Allius Celer, son of Gaius, of the Voltinian tribe, quattuorvir, flamen, augur of the colony Julia Apta, chosen from five decuriae, the Vordenses, the pagani, [dedicated this] to their patron.	CIL XII, 1114

== Religion ==
In the western part of the civitas of Apt, conventionally attributed to the pagus Vordenses, several sites are attested across Roussillon, Gordes, Goult, and especially Lioux, where a rural sanctuary of indigenous character is located. Despite the proximity of the Via Domitia, local cult practice in the area shows a strong indigenous component: while dedications to the Roman god Silvanus are particularly numerous, other attested divinities include such as Abianus, Vintur, Uxovinus, the Suleviae, and probably Ronea.
