= Albici =

Ancient Gallic tribe

The Albici (also Albieis or Albienses) were a Gallic tribe living in modern Vaucluse (southeastern France) during the Iron Age and the Roman period. A long-standing ally of the Greek colony of Massalia, they were likely incorporated into the province of Gallia Narbonensis by the Romans in the late 2nd century BC. The Albici played a notable role during the siege of Massalia in 49 BC.

== Name ==
They are mentioned as Albici by Caesar (mid-1st c. BC) and Pliny (1st c. AD), and as Albieīs ('Αλβιεĩς) and Albióchi ('Αλβίοιχοι) by Strabo (early 1st c. AD).

Strabo mentions two different names, Albieīs and Albióchi. According to Guy Barruol, they do not appear to represent two distinct peoples, but rather different linguistic forms referring to the same group. Just as the Celtic ethnic name Salyes was Latinised as Salluvii, the Greek form Albieīs (sometimes rendered Albienses in modern translations) reflects an earlier *Albii, later Latinised as Albici. The form Albici is further supported by the personal names Albiccius and Albiccia, which are qualifiers indicating origin.

The ethnonym Albieis (Gaulish *Albioi, sing. *Albios) derives from the Celtic stem albio- ('upper world, sky' < 'white'). According to Jacques Lacroix, it could have meant 'People of the Bright Land'. Their name survives in local toponyms such as the Pays d'Albion, Montagne d'Albion, Albion Plateau, and the villages of Saint-Christol-d'Albion and Revest-du-Bion. These names evoke the idea of elevation, corresponding to pre-Alpine terrain. They have also been linked to the notion of whiteness, whether from winter snow or summer light reflected on limestone.

== Geography ==
Their territory was located in the Pre-Alps mountains between the Mont Ventoux and Vercors Massif, in present-day Vaucluse. On the basis of ancient textual evidence and medieval and modern toponymy, Guy Barruol suggests locating the Albici in the natural region extending from the Luberon to the Albion Plateau. They lived north of the Salyes, west and south of the Vocontii, and east of the Cavari and Memini.

Their pre-Roman chief-town may have been one of the oppida surrounding Apt, most likely the oppidum of Perréal. Destroyed at the time of the taking of Massalia (an event more readily understood if Perréal was the capital of the Albici), it was immediately replaced by the newly founded Roman town of Apta Julia, a few kilometres away on the Alpine route. As a strategic point on the military road linking Italy to southern Gaul via the valleys of the Doire, Durance and Calavon rivers, Apta Julia was founded to colonise and romanise the indigenous groups who, having supported Massalia, were probably regarded as particularly hostile to Rome.

Barruol proposed that the Albici were at the head of a confederation that included the smaller Vulgientes and Vordenses.

== History ==
As long-standing allies of the Massaliots, the Albici were likely incorporated into Gallia Narbonensis at its creation in 121 BC or attached to the Massaliot sphere.

Caesar states that during his conflict with Pompey, when Trebonius besieged Massalia in 49 BC, the Albici were the only group called upon by the Massaliots for support. He writes that they have been "allies of the Massaliots for a very long time", and portrays them as "rough mountaineers accustomed to carrying arms", whose courage he praises. Caesar also mentions that they were mercenaries repairing fortifications and ships, and supplying Massalia with grain from neighbouring regions and from Massaliot trading posts.
