= Delta Plus Group =

French company for the protection of personal equipment

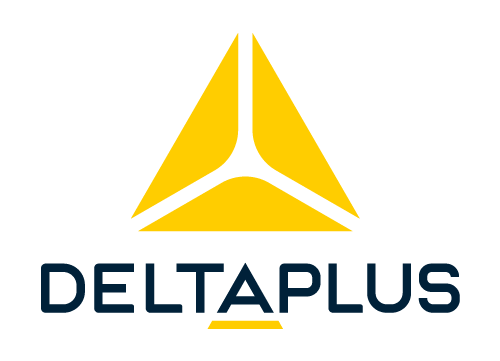
- Company type: Société anonyme
- Traded as: Euronext: ALDTL; Euronext Growth
- Industry: Personal protective equipment
- Founded: 1977
- Headquarters: Apt, France
- Area served: Worldwide
- Key people: Jacques Benoit; Jérome Benoit
- Products: Rainwear; Protective boot; Work gloves.
- Revenue: €344,2 million (2019)
- Net income: €32,44 million (2021)
- Number of employees: 3,005 (2023)
- Website: www.deltaplusgroup.com

Delta Plus Group is a French company created in 1977 and located in Apt, Vaucluse. The company designs, standardises, manufactures and markets Personal protective equipment (PPE) and collective protective equipment for professionals.

The Delta Plus Group employs nearly 3,500 people in 2023, has 46 subsidiaries worldwide, covering 110 countries, and has 18 production sites. Its product offering comprises 1,200 items providing comprehensive protection for users.
