= Vulgientes =

Gallic tribe

The Vulgientes were a Gallic tribe living in modern Vaucluse (southeastern France) during the Iron Age and the Roman period.

== Name ==
They are mentioned as Vulgientes by Pliny (1st c. AD).

== Geography ==
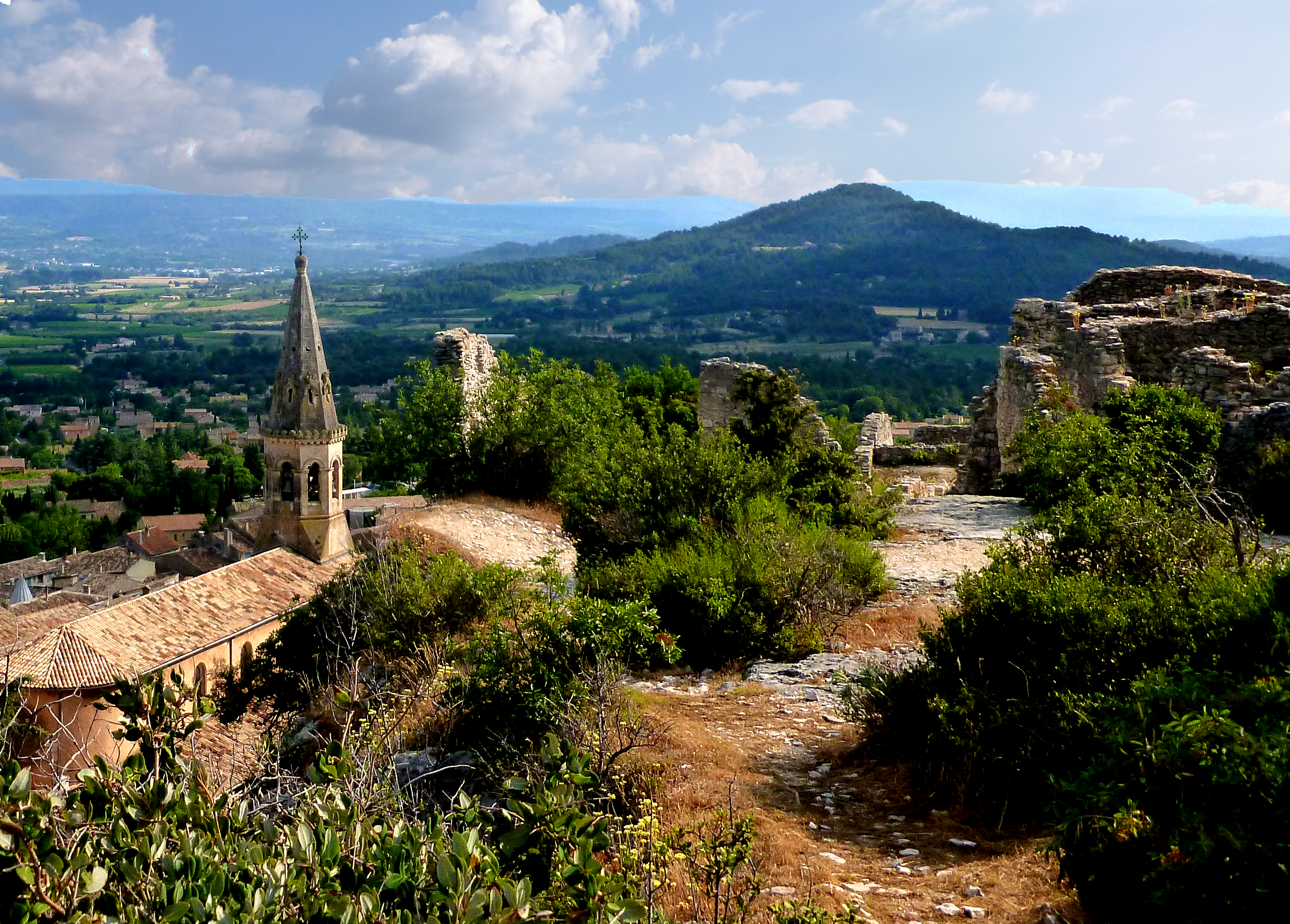
The oppidum of Perréal

Their territory was located in the Calavon valley, in present-day Vaucluse.

Their pre-Roman chief-town may have been the oppidum of Perréal, later replaced during the Roman period by Apta Julia (modern Apt), whose inhabitants were known as the Aptenses under the Empire. According to Guy Barruol, the Vulgientes did not constitute a people in their own right but rather formed a pagus corresponding to the inhabitants of this oppidum and its surrounding territory, and should be regarded as a subdivision of the Albici.

In the 1st century AD, Pliny associated the Vulgientes to Apta Julia (Apta Iulia Vulgientium), which, according to Barruol, may reflect an archaic usage rather than a contemporary ethnonym.
