= Council of the Seven Provinces =

The Council of the Seven Provinces (Concilium septem provinciarum) was a governing body of the Seven Provinces (Septem Provinciae) in the praetorian prefecture of Gaul, then part of the Western Roman Empire. Between its establishment in 418 and its decline in the 460s, it met annually in Arles between mid-August and mid-September. Its members belonged to the Gallo-Roman aristocracy, including the bishops.

An annual council was established by the praetorian prefect Petronius in 402 (or 408), perhaps in connection with a fifteen-year tax assessment. It was re-founded by the Constitutio saluberrima issued by the emperor Honorius on 17 April 418 at Ravenna, capital of the Western Empire. The Constitutio was directed to the prefect of Gaul, Agricola. According to Honorius, the council was convened "on account of public and private necessities" (propter privatas ac publicas necessitates) because the previous council had fallen defunct "either because of the indifference of the times or the neglect of usurpers" (vel incuria temporum, vel desidia tyrannorum). Although the council has been blamed for encouraging Gallic particularism, Honorius intended merely to return to the situation before the upheavals of 407–13. From this point on, however, high offices in Gaul usually fell to Gallo-Romans and not, as previously, Italians.

The public acclamation of Avitus as emperor took place in Arles on 9 July 455. The historians Edward Gibbon and J. B. Bury believed that the acclamation took place at a regular meeting of the Concilium, but this has been rejected on the grounds that Avitus arrived in Arles at the wrong time of year for this, that the public meeting include representatives from outside the Seven Provinces and that Sidonius Apollinaris records that the meeting was arranged specifically to greet Avitus.

In 468, the council indicted the praetorian prefect Arvandus and sent him to the Senate to be tried.

== Sources ==
- Bury, J. B. (1958). History of the Later Roman Empire: From the Death of Theodosius I to the Death of Justinian. New York: Dover Publications.
- Gillett, Andrew (2003). Envoys and Political Communication in the Late Antique West, 411–533. Cambridge: Cambridge University Press.
- Mathisen, Ralph W. (1989). Ecclesiastical Factionalism and Religious Controversy in Fifth-century Gaul. Washington, D.C.: Catholic University of America Press.
