= Isaac Gorni =

Musician and poet

Isaac Gorni (or Isaac ben Abraham haGorni) was a late thirteenth-century Hebrew lyric poet from Aire-sur-l'Adour in Gascony, then ruled by the English Prince Edward. Isaac probably left Gascony before the Jews were expelled by a royal edict of 1287, perhaps in 1275, 1281, or 1282, when heavy taxes were collected from the Jews. His surname derives from the Hebrew goren, "threshing floor", the Occitan for which is aire, as in his birthplace.

He wrote a song dedicated to the citizens of Aire, recalling both the "lords who stand in the breach in times of her distress" and the Jewish intellectuals, but not referring to any exile. It probably therefore predates 1287, but it already demonstrates Isaac's penchant for pomposity: comparing Aire and Jerusalem, he suggests that the Messiah, if he knew that Isaac was born in Aire, would choose to be born there as well. In other poems, however, Isaac refers to Jerusalem by the poetic term golat Ariel ("exile of Ariel"), perhaps a play on "exile from Aire".

Isaac was widely travelled. In Provence he journeyed through Arles, Aix, Manosque, Carpentras, Apt, and Draguignan. He also went into Languedoc and Catalonia sojourning in Narbonne, Perpignan, and Luz. His habit was to enjoy the hospitality of the local Jewish community in return for entertaining it. He also accompanied himself on the kinnor, which was tied to his shoulder. He was not always successful, and his poems often record the ingratitude he encountered.

Eighteen of his works have survived, all in one manuscript. They belong to the tradition of the troubadours and courtly love. Two of these have been translated into English: "Gorni Pleads His Cause" and "The Fate of the Adulterer". The first attacks the nobility of Arles for refusing him the patronage he believed he merited. The second imagines his death and his legacy (which is lust and fornication). It is a parody of the planh.

== Bibliography ==
- T. Carmi, ed. (1981), The Penguin Book of Hebrew Verse (New York: Viking Press).
- Susan Einbinder (2005), "Isaac b. Abraham haGorni: The Myth, the Man, and the Manuscript," International Medieval Congress, Western Michigan University, Kalamazoo.
- W. D. Paden and F. F. Paden (2007), Troubadour Poems from the South of France (Cambridge: D. S. Brewer).
- Jefim Schirmann (1949), "Isaac Gorni, poète hébreu de Provence," Lettres Romanes, 3:175–200.
- Jefim Schirmann (1954), "The Function of the Hebrew Poet in Medieval Spain," Jewish Social Studies, 16(3):235–52.
