= Segovellauni =

Gallic tribe

The Segovellauni (Gaulish: *Segouellaunoi, 'chiefs-of-victory') were a small Gallic tribe dwelling in the modern Drôme department, near the present-day city of Valence, during the Iron Age and the Roman period.

Little is known about the early history of the Segovellauni. After 121 BC, their territory was annexed to the province of Gallia Transalpina by the Roman Republic. In 62 BC, their oppidum Ventia was destroyed by the Roman legate Manlius Lentinus during the revolt of the Allobroges. By the 1st century AD, the Segovellauni were part of the Cavarian confederation.

== Name ==
They are mentioned as Sengalaunoì (Σεγγαλαυνοὶ; var. σεταλλανοι) by Ptolemy (2nd c. AD). A regio segovellaunorum is also attested by Pliny (1st c. AD).

The ethnonym Segovellauni is a latinized form of Gaulish *Segouellaunoi (sing. *Segouellaunos), which literally means 'chiefs-of-victory'. It stems from the root sego- ('victory, strength') attached to the word uellaunos ('chief, commandant').

== Geography ==
=== Territory ===
The Segovellauni dwelled in the valley of the Rhône river, south of the Isère river and west of the Vercors Massif, around the present-day city of Valence. This land, corresponding to the modern Valentinois region, was called the 'Island' by Polybius and Livy in their description of Hannibal's crossing of the Alps in 218 BC, for it was situated between the Rhône and the Isère, near the confluence of the two rivers. In the south, their territory stretched down to the Drôme river, or perhaps further south into the plain of Montélimar. It likely covered the Vivarais region west of the Rhône, between the rivers Eyrieux and Doux.

... [Hannibal] reached a place called the 'Island', a populous district producing abundance of corn and deriving its name from its situation; for the Rhone and Isère running along each side of it meet at its point. It is similar in size and shape to the Egyptian Delta; only in that case the sea forms the base line uniting the two branches of the Nile, while here the base line is formed by a range of mountains difficult to climb or penetrate, and, one may say, almost inaccessible.

— Polybius 2010. Historíai, 3:49.

On the fourth day’s march, he reached the Island. There, in the middle of the plains, is the confluence of the Isère and Rhone rivers, which run down from different Alpine ranges, enclosing a considerable amount of land; and the name given to it is “the Island.” The Allobroges live close by, a tribe that in those days was already second to none of the Gallic tribes in wealth or reputation.

— Livy 2019. Ab Urbe Condita Libri, 21:31.

The Barrington Atlas locates their territory south of the Allobroges, north of the Helvii, Tricastini and Vocontii, east of the Vellavi, and west of the Vertamocorii and Tricorii. The Segovellauni were in control of a section of the Isère river mouth, from which they were able to hold the Allobroges at bay. Like the Tricastini and Memini, they nonetheless lived as clients of the neighbouring Cavari as part of their confederation.

=== Settlements ===
The location of the pre-Roman chief town of the Segovellauni has been debated in scholarship, but it is traditionally ascribed to the oppidum of Malpas (Soyons), on the west bank of the Rhône. During the Allobrogian revolt of 62 BC, the Roman legate Manlius Lentinus stationed troops in the territory of the Segovellauni, near an oppidum named Ventia. Although its location remains obscure, some scholars have proposed to identify Ventia with Malpas, which would explain why the Roman legates Lucius Marius and Servius Galba "crossed the Rhone" towards the territory of the Allobroges, itself located between the Rhône and the Alps, in Cassius Dio's account of the events.

In the second part of the 1st century BC, the Segovellauni were absorbed into the civitas Valentinorum (or colonia Valentia), founded under Caesar or Augustus. According to Stephen L. Dyson, a border land around their capital, Valentia (modern Valence), seems to have been detached from the territory of the Cavari and given to the smaller Segovellauni by the Romans, since Pliny (1st c. AD) described the settlement as in agro Cavarum, whereas Ptolemy (2nd c. AD) had it belonging to the Segovellauni.

== History ==
=== Origin ===
Little is known about the early history of the Segovellauni. Since the 'Island' mentioned by ancient authors corresponds to their territory, some scholars have proposed that Brancus (or Braneus), the Gallic chieftain who allied with Hannibal and provided him with supplies and diplomatic protection in 218 BC, was actually Segovellaunian. In this view, Braneus may have found an agreement with the Allobroges of the plain to let the Carthaginians move across their territory. Possibly acting as a rearguard, Segovellaunian troops then escorted them until the Alps, where the Carthaginians were eventually left alone with the hostile Allobroges of the mountains, who were not part of the agreement. In his account, however, Livy specifically states that the two chieftains were Allobrogian.

=== Early Roman period ===
When the Allobroges were defeated by Rome in 121 BC, their territory was annexed to the Roman Republic, and the Segovellauni certainly knew the same fate. In 62 BC, they were associated with an unsuccessful revolt against Rome led by the Allobroges, for the troops of Manlius Lentinus were stationed in their territory, near a small oppidum named Ventia. According to Cassius Dio, the Roman army "so terrified the inhabitants that the majority ran away and the rest sent ambassadors regarding peace. Just then the country population coming to their aid suddenly fell upon him; and he was repulsed from the wall, but ravaged the land with impunity" until Catugnatus, the leader of the Allobroges, came to their aid with some troops stationed along the Isère. Lentinus was nearly captured by Catugnatus, but a violent storm prevented the Gauls from pursuing the attack. The Roman legate then overran the Segovellaunian territory again and eventually destroyed Ventia.
