= Memini (tribe) =

Celto-Ligurian tribe

The Memini were a Gallic tribe living in the Comtat Venaissin region, in the area of present-day Carpentras, during the Iron Age and the Roman period.

== Name ==
They are mentioned as Meminorum by Pliny (1st c. AD).

== Geography ==
Their chief town was Carpentorate (modern Carpentras), listed by Pliny in the 1st century AD as Carpentoracte Meminorum as an oppidum Latinum. Its pre-Roman ancestor may have been the hill-fort of La Légue. In the early 2nd century, Ptolemy, drawing on earlier sources, refers to the settlement as Forum Neronis, a temporary designation intended to replace the indigenous name Carpentorate and likely introduced during the colonial foundation by Tiberius Claudius Nero around 46–45 BC. This designation did not endure, and the settlement later reverted to its native name. Epigraphic evidence further indicates that Carpentorate attained the status of a Latin colony under the name Colonia Iulia Meminorum.

The Memini were located east of the Cavari, south of the Vocontii, and west of the Albici. The boundaries of their pre-Roman territory were later preserved in those of the civitas Carpentoratensis, and later the bishopric of Carpentras and Comtat Venaissin. This area was enclosed by the Dentelles de Montmirail and Mont Ventoux to the north and the Monts de Vaucluse to the east. To the west and south, the border followed marshland and low-lying terrain, with natural barriers such as wetlands and sterile hills marking the limits between their territory and neighbouring regions.

In the pre-Roman era, the Memini were clients of the most powerful Cavari.
