= Septem Provinciae =

Diocese of the Roman Empire

Diocese of the Seven Provinces Dioecesis Septem Provinciarum
- Diocese of the Roman Empire
- 314–477
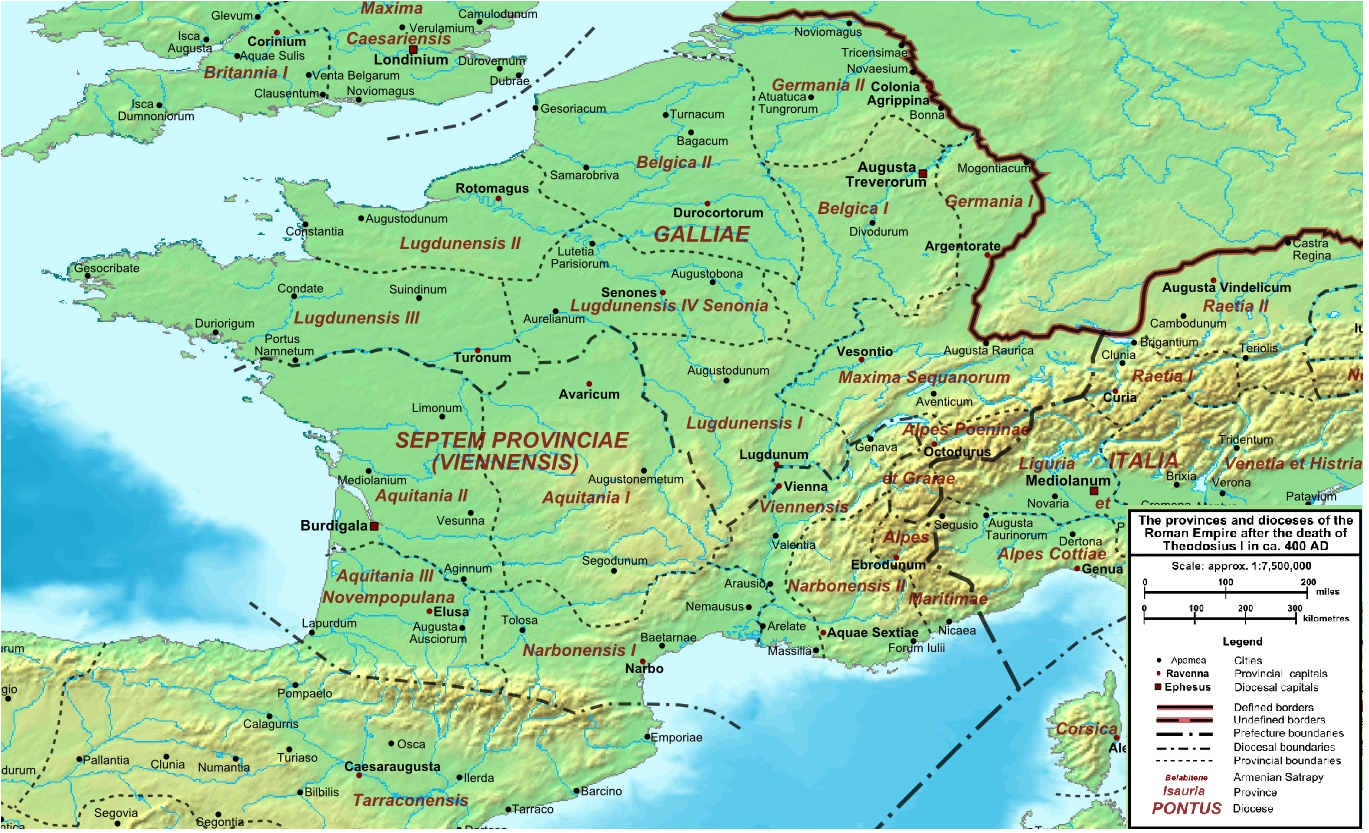
- Roman Gaul - AD 400
- Capital: Burdigala
- Historical era: Late Antiquity
  - Established: 314
  - Fall of Provence to the Visigoths: 477

The Diocese of the Seven Provinces (Latin: Dioecesis Septem Provinciarum), originally called the Diocese of Vienne (Latin: Dioecesis Viennensis) after the city of Vienna (modern Vienne), was a diocese of the later Roman Empire, under the praetorian prefecture of Gaul. It encompassed southern and western Gaul (Aquitania and Gallia Narbonensis), that is, modern France south and west of the Loire, including Provence.

The diocese comprised the following provinces: Aquitanica I, Aquitanica II, Novempopulana (Aquitanica III), Narbonensis I, Narbonensis II, Viennensis and Alpes Maritimae.

== History ==
The diocese was established during the reforms of Diocletian who reigned from 284 to 305. It is attested early in the reign of Constantine I in the Verona List which has been dated to around 314. In 402 an annual provincial assembly, the Concilium septem provinciarum, was established in Arles.

In 407, the Vandals and their allies invaded Gaul, devastating the region until they departed for the Iberian peninsula in 409. The Visigoths were brought in as foederati to aid the Romans against them, and in 418 emperor Honorius allowed them to settle in Aquitania around Toulouse. Although nominally Roman subjects, the Goths were practically independent, a fact which was formally recognized by the Western Empire in 475, just one year before its end.

In 462 Ricimer ceded them also the province of Narbonensis Prima, while the Goths proceeded to occupy the remaining provinces east of the Rhone in 477. Henceforth, the lands that had comprised the diocese of the Seven Provinces became part of the Visigothic Kingdom. Aquitania was soon lost to the Franks, with only the southern coastal strip (Septimania) retained by the Goths.

== See also ==
- List of Late Roman provinces
- Ancient ecclesiastic diocese of Vienne
- Aquitania
- Gallia Narbonensis

== Sources ==
- (in Italian) Heather, La caduta dell'Impero romano. Una nuova storia, 2006.
- Halsall, Barbarian migrations in the roman West, 376-568, 2007.
