= Cavari =

Gallic tribal confederation

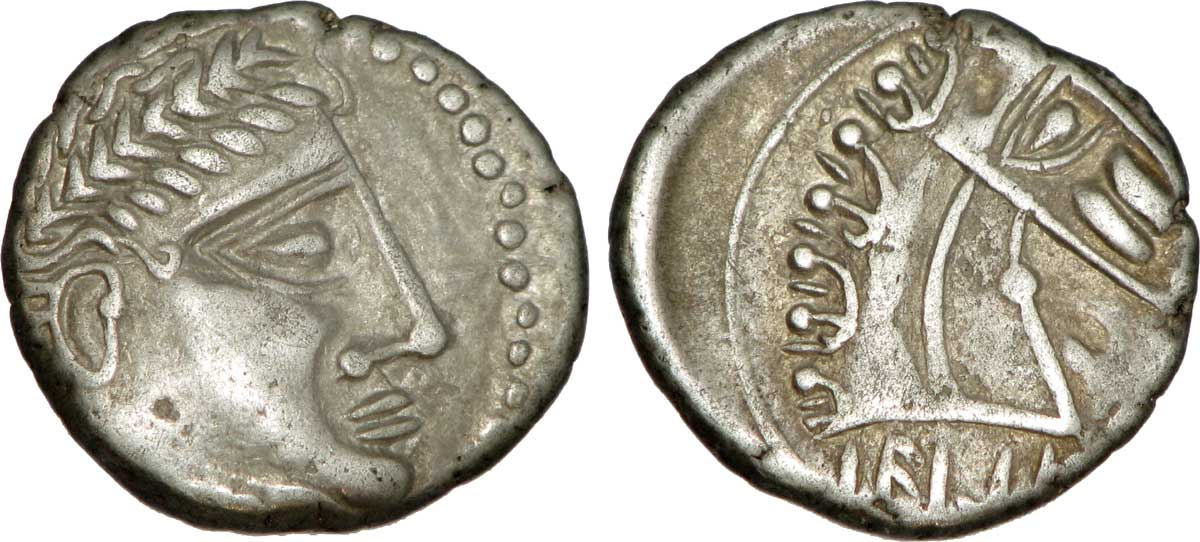
Cavarian denier (1st c. BC).

The Cavari or Cavares (Gaulish: *Cauaroi, 'the heroes, champions, mighty men') were a Gallic tribe dwelling in the western part of modern Vaucluse, around the present-day cities of Avignon, Orange and Cavaillon, during the Roman period. They were at the head of a confederation of tribes that included the Tricastini, Segovellauni and Memini, and whose territory stretched further north along the Rhône Valley up to the Isère river.

== Name ==
They are mentioned as Kaouárōn (Καουάρων) by Strabo (early 1st c. AD), Cavarum by Pliny (1st c. AD), Cavarum and Cavaras by Pomponius Mela (mid-1st c. AD), Kaúaroi (Καύαροι) by Ptolemy (2nd c. AD), and as Cavares on the Tabula Peutingeriana (5th c. AD).

The ethnonym Cavarī is a Latinized form of Gaulish *Cauaroi (sing. *Cauaros), meaning 'the heroes', or 'the mighty men'' It derives from the Celtic stem *kawaro-, meaning 'hero, champion' (cf. Old Irish cuar hero, champion, warrior', Middle Welsh cawr, Breton kaour 'giant, champion').

== Geography ==
=== Territory ===
The Cavari dwelled on the east bank of the Rhône river, between the Durance (Druentia) and the Tricastin. The Barrington Atlas locates their territory west of the Vocontii, Memini, Albici and Dexivates, south of the Segovellauni and Tricastini, east of the Volcae Arecomici, north of the Anatilii and Salyes. Some scholars have proposed that the actual boundary between the Salyes and Cavari was the marshy area north of St-Rémy rather than the Durance.

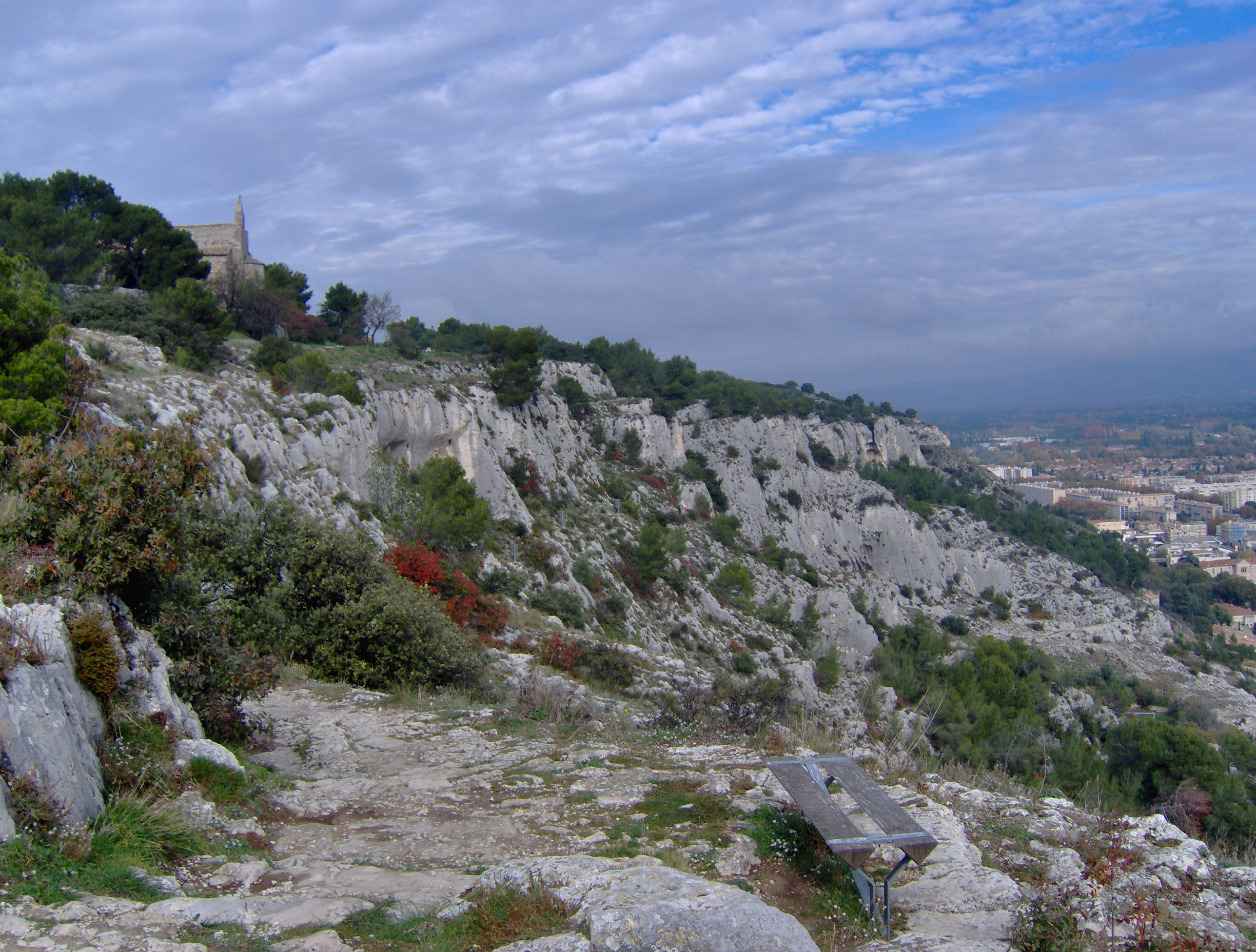
Oppidum of Cabellio

Strabo mentioned that the lands from Cabellio (Cavaillon) up to the confluence of the Isère with the Rhône belonged to the Cavari, Pliny placed Valence in Cavarian territory, and Ptolemy located them immediately south of the Segovellauni, which indicates that they controlled, further north of their homeland, a strip of land along the Rhône up to the confluence of this river with the Isère.

... if you cross the river by ferry into the city of Caballio, the whole country next thereafter belongs to the Cavari, up to the confluence of the Isar with the Rhodanus; this is also approximately where the Cemmenus Mountain joins the Rhodanus; the length of your journey from Druentia up to this place is seven hundred stadia.

— Strabo 1923. Geōgraphiká 4:1:11.

=== Settlements ===
The pre-Roman hill-fort of the Cavari was probably situated on the Colline St-Eutrope, a hill overlooking the modern town of Orange, Vaucluse.

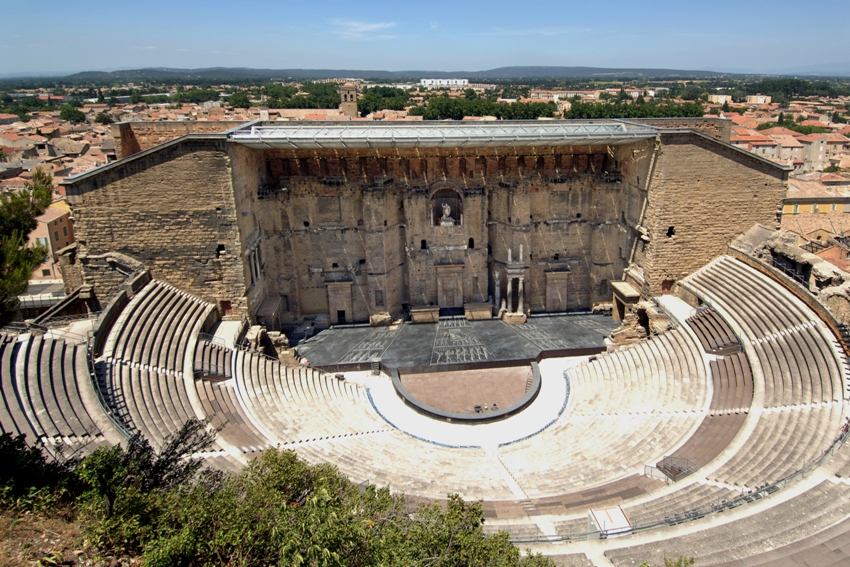
Roman theatre of Arausio.

During the Roman era, their main settlement was known as Arausio (modern Orange). It was founded as Colonia Julia Firma Secundanorum Arausio ca. 35 BC by Octavian for the veterans of Legio II Gallica, in the vicinity of their hill-fort. Arausio is best known today for two surviving Roman monuments: the Triumphal Arch of Orange, probably built in two phases under Augustus (27 BC–14 AD) and Tiberius (from 26 AD), and the Theatre of Orange, one of the best preserved Roman theatres, likely build at the time of the foundation of the colony.

Other important settlements were located at Cabellio (Cavaillon) and Avennio (Avignon). Erected as a hill-fort on the Rocher des Doms, Avennio grew into a prosperous settlement during the Iron Age. By the end of the 3rd century BC, Avennio likely belonged to the Volcae, who controlled at that time both sides of the Rhône. Artemidorus (fl. 100 BC) described Cabellio and Avennio as Massaliote cities, which probably indicates that they came under Greek control after the Roman conquest of southeastern Gaul in 125–121 BC. Greek influence is confirmed archaeologically by pottery, coins and bilingual inscriptions.

== History ==
=== Early Roman period ===
The Cavari are not attested in historical sources before the Augustan period, and little is known about their early history. They may have originally belonged to the Allobrogian or Vocontian sphere of influence.

Between 125 and 122 BC, the armies of the Roman Republic crossed the Alps and fought the Salluvii and Vocontii. After the Allobroges gave shelter to the Salluvian chiefs and raided the Aedui, a recent ally of Rome, the latter declared war against them. In 121 BC, the Roman forces defeated the Allobroges at the Battle of Vindalium, which took place near Vindalium, a Cavarian settlement probably corresponding to Mourre-de-Sève (Sorgues). In the aftermath of a decisive Gallic defeat at the Battle of the Isère River in August of the same year, the territory of the Cavari was integrated into the province of Gallia Transalpina some time between 120 and 117 BC. During the Cimbrian War, the Battle of Arausio took place near their hill-fort in October 105 BC.

The Cavari seem to have not taken part in those conflicts, and the absence of their name from the records of the Roman victories during the First Transalpine War (125–121 BC) and the Gallic Wars (58–50 BC) may suggest that they had friendly relations with Rome.

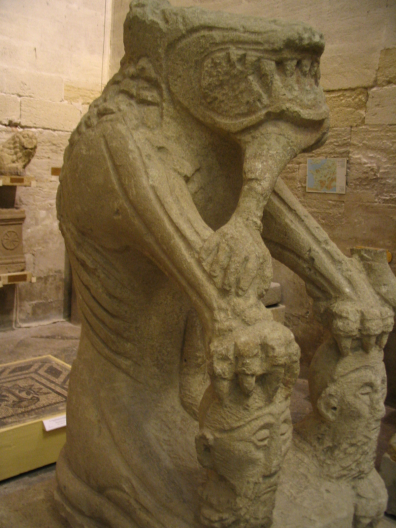
Tarasque of Noves

=== Roman period ===
At the time of Augustus (27 BC–14 AD), the Cavari were at the head of a confederation stretching between the Durance and the Isère river, and which included the Memini, Tricastini and Segovellauni. They were also in control of the area located around Avennio, on the eastern bank of the Rhône, which had previously belonged to the Volcae and Massalia. In the early 1st century AD, Greek geographer Strabo described them as mostly, though apparently recently, Romanized:

... the Cavari stretching along parallel to [the Volcae] on the opposite side of the river, the name of the Cavari prevails, and people are already calling by that name all the barbarians in that part of the country—no, they are no longer barbarians, but are, for the most part, transformed to the type of the Romans, both in their speech and in their modes of living, and some of them in their civic life as well.

— Strabo 1923. Geōgraphiká 4:1:12.

== Archaeology ==
The Tarasque of Noves anthropophagous statue, displayed in the Musée Calvet in Avignon, is attributed to the Cavari.
