= Tricastini =

Gallic tribe

The Tricastini were a small Gallic tribe dwelling in the modern Tricastin region, near present-day Saint-Paul-Trois-Châteaux, during the Iron Age and the Roman period.

The Tricastini were probably one of the most ancient Celtic tribes of Gaul. They are first mentioned in Livy's legendary narration of Bellovesus' expedition from Gaul into Italy, then in his historical account of Hannibal's crossing of the Alps in 218 BC, when the Tricastini let the Carthaginian troops move across their land. After 121 BC, their territory was annexed to the province of Gallia Transalpina by the Roman Republic. By the 1st century AD, the Tricastini were part of the Cavarian confederation.

== Name ==
=== Attestations ===
They are mentioned as Tricastinos by Livy (late 1st century BC), and as Trikastínoi (Τρικαστίνοι; var. Τρικαττίνοι, Τριστακηνοὶ, Τρικαστηνοὶ) by Ptolemy (2nd century AD). Their chief town is documented as Augusta Tricastinorum by Pliny (1st century AD). The Tricastini were also known as Tricassis during the Roman period.

=== Etymology ===
The Celtic ethnonym Tricastini is traditionally derived from the root tri- ('three'). The second element, -casti-, is an archaic form of -cassi-, which possibly means 'tin, bronze' (cf. Gaulish Cassi-dannos, 'magistrate in charge of bronze coins', Britt. Cassivellaunus, 'Chief-of-Tin'; also Greek κασσίτερος, 'tin'). Alternatively, Tricastini may be interpreted as an older variant of Tricasses, meaning 'those of the three (many) curls' or the 'three-braided ones'.

Mélanie Mairecolas and Jean-Marie Pailler propose a related interpretation. Retaining the connection of the element with tin, they analyse tri- not as 'three' but in the sense 'across, through' (Gaulish trē- < *trei-; cf. Latin trans), so that both the Tricastini and the Tricasses would denote 'the conveyors of tin', on the model of the Treveri ('the ferrymen'). They connect this with the role of the Tricastin region as a transshipment point from the Rhône toward the Alpine passes on a tin route.

The city of Saint-Paul-Trois-Châteaux, attested as Augusta Tricastinorum in the 1st century AD and as Civitas Tricastinorum in the 4th century, is named after the tribe. It appears as civitate Tricastrina in 1136, and most likely evolved into Sanctum Paulum *Tricastrum during the Middle Ages, (Note: Attested as Sancti Pauli (vel Sancti Restituti Trigastinensi) in 993, as San Paul c. 1180, and as Sanctum Paulum Tricastinensem in 1338.) then into Sainct Pol Trois Chasteaux by 1545. The insertion of an epenthetic r that changed Tricastini to Tricastrini, a form already attested by the 12th century, caused a semantic reinterpretation of the name, leading eventually to the modern French Trois-Châteaux, meaning 'three-castles' (Latin Tria-Castra). The region of Tricastin, attested as Tricassinus during the Roman era, also takes its name from the tribe.

== Geography ==
=== Territory ===
During the Roman period, the Tricastini dwelled in the modern Tricastin region, between the Rhône river and the Diois Mountains, south of the Jabron river (near present-day Montélimar), and north of the Uchaux Mountains, located between Mornas and Lagarde-Paréol. The Barrington Atlas locates their territory west of the Vocontii, north of the Cavares, south of the Segovellauni, and east of the Helvii. Like the Segovellauni, they were clients of the Cavari as part of their confederation.

Some scholars have proposed that the original territory of the Tricastini was located further east of their attested homeland, in a mountainous region near the settlement of Altonum (Le Pègue). Principally occupied from the late 6th to the 3rd century BC, Le Pègue represented the eastern frontier of their territory in the late 1st century BC. In this view, the Tricastini could have moved towards the Rhône valley in the 3rd–early 2nd century in search for economic opportunities. This could explain the archaic form of their tribal name, which may reflect the fossilization of an ancestral ethnonym preserved in a remote area and unaffected by later linguistic change.

When the colony of Arausio (Orange) was founded c. 36/35 BC, a very large part of their territory was given to the Roman colonists. An eastern portion of this area was then handed back to the Tricastini, apparently corresponding the less fertile lands that were not attributed to the settlers.

=== Settlements ===
==== Early Roman period ====
During the Republican period (121–27 BC), their chief town was the oppidum of Barry (Saint-Restitut), one of the largest of southern Gaul (40ha), and possibly mentioned as Aeria by Apollodorus in the mid-2nd century BC. The site of Barry was located on a commercially strategic position in the Rhône Valley, a natural corridor linking the Greek colony of Massalia to northern Gaul. Other oppida are known at Saint-Saturnin (Donzère) and Moulon (Roussas). The settlement of Senomagos ("old market"), which corresponds to modern Saint-Pierre-de-Sénos (Bollène), was located at the foot of the oppidum of Barry.

Another town, Novem Craris (now Logis-de-Berre, in Les Granges-Gontardes), was located in the plain. It occupied an important position on the trade route of the Rhône Valley even before the Roman period. Destroyed by fire in the 3rd century AD, the settlement was rebuilt on a neighbouring site.

==== Roman Empire ====
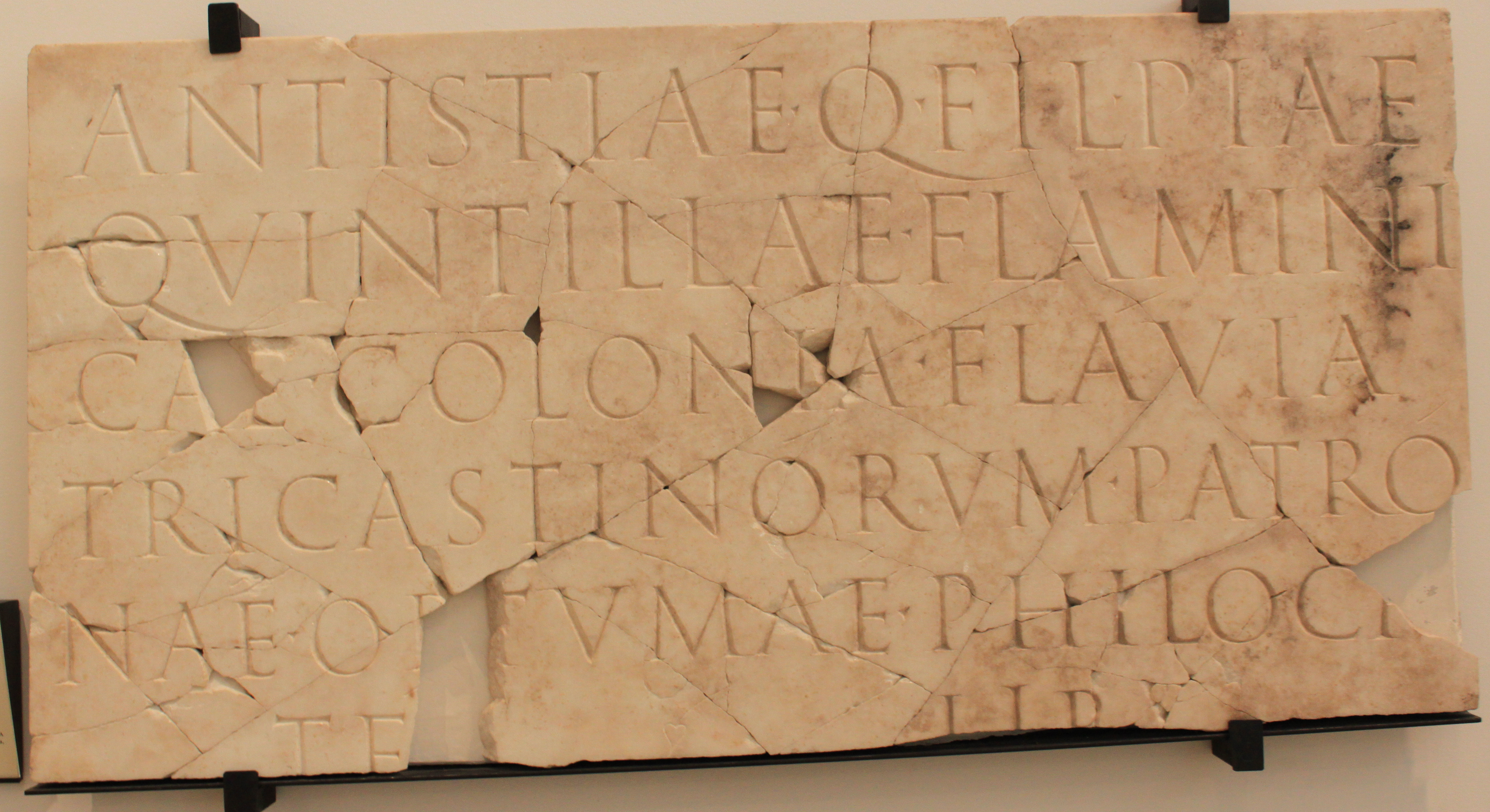
Inscription from Vasio mentioning Antistia Pia Quintilla, the flamen of the Colonia Flavia Tricastinorum.

Both Senomagos and Barry (Aeria) were likely abandoned after the foundation of Augusta Tricastinorum by the Romans in the late 1st century BC. By the first century AD, the settlement was referred to as Augusta Tricastinorum, then elevated to Colonia Flavia Tricastinorum in Flavian times.

In the 2nd century AD, Ptolemy mentioned a Noiomagos ("new market") as the capital of the Tricastini, but this is probably a confusion with modern Nyons, in Vocontian lands, which was known as Noviomagos in ancient times. Alternatively some scholars have argued that it was the name originally given to Augusta Tricastinorum. In this view, the double toponym may suggest that the settlement was originally founded during the Republican period, before it took its attested name under Augustus (27 BC–14 AD), although available archaeological evidence do not predate the late 1st century BC.

== History ==
=== Origin ===
The Tricastini are mentioned by Livy in the late 1st century BC, in connection with the legendary Celtic invasion of Italy said to have been led by Bellovesus around 600 BC.

Whereupon to Segovesus were by lot assigned the Hercynian highlands; but to Bellovesus the gods proposed a far pleasanter road, into Italy. Taking out with him the surplus population of his tribes, the Bituriges, Arverni, Senones, Haedui, Ambarri, Carnutes, and Aulerci, he marched with vast numbers of infantry and cavalry into the country of the Tricastini.

— Livy 2019. Ab Urbe Condita Libri, 5.34.

Since the myth was probably based on historical events, this could indicate that the Tricastini were already living in Gaul, apparently near their attested homeland, at the time of the Battle of the Allia (387 BC), from which the legend appears to derive. Although the tribal names may also have been taken from names current at the time of Livy, Guy Barruol argues that it would be unlikely for Livy to single out this minor group rather than the more prominent Cavari, who dominated the middle Rhône valley when he was writing. At any rate, the archaic form of the name Tricastini probably indicates an ancient ethnogenesis. Although it is attested only in the Roman era, the name is not affected by the Gaulish -st- > -ss- sound shift, which suggests a fossilization of their ancestral ethnonym, possibly in a mountainous area.

=== Early history ===
In Livy's account of Hannibal's crossing of the Alps in 218 BC, the Carthaginian general is said to have "veered to the left into the lands of the Tricastini" after setting a dispute between Allobrogian chieftains.

After settling the Allobrogian disputes Hannibal now headed for the Alps, but instead of taking the direct route he veered to the left into the lands of the Tricastini. He then advanced through the border territory of the Vocontii into the territory of the Trigorii, meeting no obstacle anywhere on his route until he reached the River Druentia.

— Livy 2019. Ab Urbe Condita Libri, 21.31.

After 121 BC, their territory was annexed by the Roman Republic into the province of Gallia Transalpina.
