= Luc-en-Diois =

- Commune
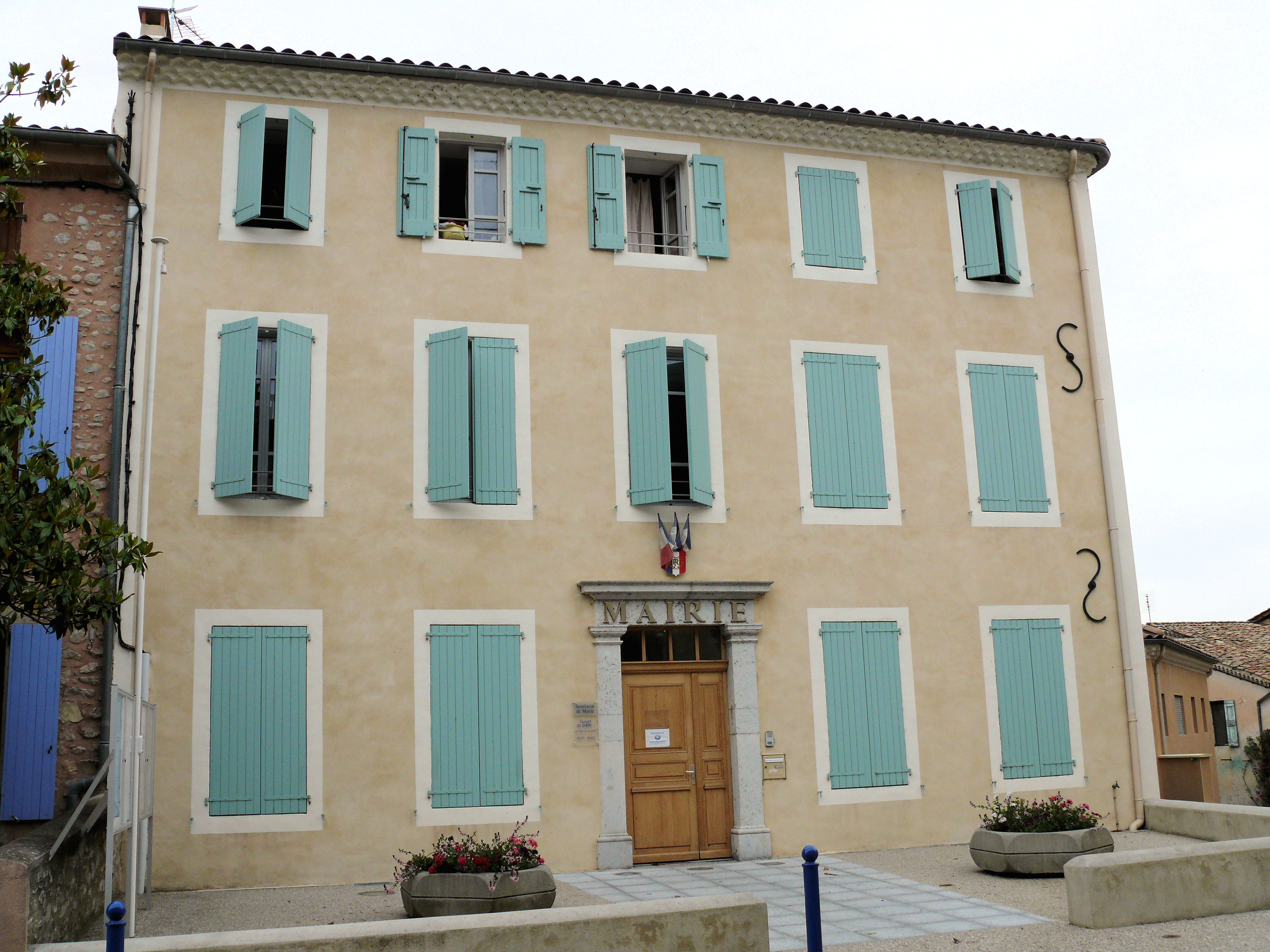
- Town hall
- Location of Luc-en-Diois
- Location within France Location within Auvergne-Rhône-Alpes
- Coordinates: 44°36′56″N 5°27′12″E
- Country: France
- Region: Auvergne-Rhône-Alpes
- Department: Drôme
- Arrondissement: Die
- Canton: Le Diois
- Intercommunality: Diois

Government
  - Mayor (2020–2026): Jérôme Mellet
- Area^{1}: 23.49 km^{2} (9.07 sq mi)
- Elevation: 581 m (1,906 ft)
- Highest elevation: 1,245 m (4,085 ft)
- Lowest elevation: 501 m (1,644 ft)
- Population (2023): 614
  - Density: 26.1/km^{2} (67.7/sq mi)
- Time zone: UTC+01:00 (CET)
  - Summer (DST): UTC+02:00 (CEST)
- INSEE/Postal code: 26167 /26310
- ^{1} French Land Register data, which excludes lakes, ponds, glaciers > 1 km^{2} (0.386 sq mi or 247 acres) and river estuaries.

Luc-en-Diois (French pronunciation: [lyk ɑ̃ diwa]; Occitan: Luc de Diés; Latin: Lucus Augusti or Lucus) is a commune in the Drôme department in southeastern France. It is situated on the river Drôme.

== History ==
The Latin name of Luc-en-Diois, Lucus Augusti or Lucus for short, evokes a crowned wood of the Gauls. Perhaps this is the origin of this Roman capital installed in the first century BC at the foot of the mountains of Diois. It shared with Vaison-la-Romaine the title of chief city of Vocontii, an important romanized Gallic people. (Tacitus, Hist. i. 66, calls it municipium Vocontiorum; Pliny iii. 4).

Lucus was incorporated into the Roman province of Gallia Narbonensis, and is placed by the Antonine Itinerary on a road from Vapincum (modern Gap) to Lugdunum (modern Lyon): it is the first stage after Mons Seleucus, and lies between Mons Seleucus and Dea Vocontiorum (modern Die).

The vestiges of the ancient city, which one supposes to be monumental, are partially hidden by landslide debris which having stopped the course of the river Drôme, caused the river to spread out and form lakes which further obscured the site. What is visible includes the remains of a large temple, built on the same model as that of Vienne, an arm of a monumental statue (more than 4 m in height) and many inscriptions are visible in Museums of Die and of Diois. For unknown reasons, the capital of Voconces was transferred to Die around the beginning of the 2nd century AD. Little by little, the city withered, eventually becoming a mansio, merely a station on the side of a Roman road, by the beginning of 4th century. A fort was however installed at the same time at the top of the peak of Luc, in order to supervise the road, which acquired a strategic importance since the Roman armies fought on the Rhine. The road, which ran between the Durance and the Rhône, was the most practicable route in winter to connect Milan and Cologne.

== Population ==
Historical population
Year	Pop.	±% p.a.
1968	518	—
1975	452	−1.93%
1982	450	−0.06%
1990	478	+0.76%
1999	490	+0.28%
2007	532	+1.03%
2012	422	−4.53%
2017	527	+4.54%
2023	614	+2.58%
Source: INSEE

== See also ==
- Communes of the Drôme department
