= Vocontii =

Gallic tribe

The Vocontii (Gaulish: *Uocontioi; Greek: Οὐοκόντιοι, Οὐοκοντίων) were a Gallic people dwelling on the western foothills of the Alps during the Iron Age and the Roman period.

The Vocontii settled in the region in the 3rd century BC at the latest. Pompeius Trogus, a Gallo-Roman historian and citizen of Vasio during the 1st century BC, was a member of the Vocontii. During the Roman period, they were probably at the head of a confederation that included the Sogiontii, Avantici, Sebaginni and Vertamocorii.

== Name ==
They are mentioned as Vocontii (in the genitive plural Vocontiorum) by Caesar (mid-1st c. BC), Livy (late 1st c. BC), Pliny (1st c. AD) and Pomponius Mela (mid-1st c. AD), as Ouokóntioi (Οὐοκόντιοι, gen. pl. Ouokontíōn [Οὐοκοντίων]) by Strabo (early 1st c. AD), Ou̓okóntioi (Οὐοκόντιοι) by Ptolemy (2nd c. AD), and as Bocontii on the Tabula Peutingeriana.

The ethnonym Vocontiī is a latinized form of Gaulish *Uocontioi. It is generally understood to mean 'twenty' (cf. Gaul. tricontis 'thirty'), that is to say the 'twenty clans' or 'twenty tribes', or alternatively 'the two hundred' (cf. Gaul. conto- 'one hundred'), after a Gallic custom of including numbers in tribal names (e.g. Vo-corii, Tri-corii, Petru-corii, Suess-iones).

== Geography ==
=== Territory ===
The territory of the Vocontii was bordered in the north by the Isère river, in the west by the valley of the Rhône river, in the south by the Mont Ventoux and the lower reaches of the Durance river, and in the east by the upper reaches of the Durance. The Barrington Atlas locates their territory south of the Allobroges, east of the Segovellauni and the Cavares, and north of the Salluvii.

=== Settlements ===
During the Roman period, the Vocontii became a civitas foederata and had two capitals: Vasio (Vaison-la-Romaine) and Lucus Augusti (Luc-en-Diois), both benefiting from a ius Latii.

The Roman town of Noviomagus was probably Nyons. This town and Vasio (Vaison-la-Romaine) were not on the mountains. They were at the foot of the first prealpine ridges, at the edge of the plain of the Rhône (the Dentelles de Montmirail were just to the south of Vasio; the Éssaillon, Garde-Grosse, Saint Jaumes and Vaux formed a half crescent by Noviomagus).

== History ==
During the 4th century BCE, the Celtic Vocontii became settled there, with an oppidum south of modern Vaison; this seems to have been used to control trade between the Rhône and Durance rivers (Meffre).

The earliest historical mention of the Vocontii is from 218 BCE during the crossing of the Alps by Hannibal, as recounted in Livy:

After composing the dissensions of the Allobroges, when he now was proceeding to the Alps, he directed his course thither, not by the straight road, but turned to the left into the country of the Tricastini, thence by the extreme boundary of the territory of the Vocontii he proceeded to the Tricorii; his way not being anywhere obstructed until he came to the river Druentia. In 121 BC

The Vocontii were defeated by Marcus Fulvius Flaccus, a Roman consul, in 125 BCE and by Gaius Sextius Calvinus, a Roman proconsul, in 123 BCE during military campaigns against the Ligurians and Salluvii who lived to their south. In 121 BC Quintus Fabius Maximus Allobrogicus and Gnaeus Domitius Ahenobarbus defeated the Allobroges, who lived to the north of the Vocontii, and the Averni, who lived to the west of the River Rhône. In 118 BC Gnaeus Domitius founded a Roman colony at Narbo, near Hispania. Southern Gaul came under Roman control and was known as Gallia Transalpina. Over time it came to be organised as a province of the Roman Empire. With the reorganisation of the provinces of the Roman Empire under Augustus, Gallia Transalpina was renamed Gallia Narbonensis. It was named after Narbo, which became its capital.

Pliny the Elder, who wrote in the 70s AD, referred to the Vocontii as allies. This means that they were not turned into Roman subjects. They remained autonomous. They were allowed to continue to observe their own laws and did not have to pay a tribute. However, they had to supply auxiliary soldiers to Rome. The date of the grant of an alliance treaty (foedus) is unknown. Goudineau had speculated that it may have been made by Gaius Pomptinus after he suppressed the last rebellion of the Allobroges in 61 BCE when he was the governor of Gallia Transalpina However, this is not certain. Pliny also named the town of Vasio in his record of people and places which had Latin rights.

When Marcus Fonteius, was governor of Gallia Transalpina, either in 76-74 or 74-72 BC, he was attacked by the Vocontii. He defeated them. Cicero did not say why they rebelled. Presumably this was connected to the heavy indebtedness with was incurred by the Gauls in the region which was due to taxes which were levied by Fonteius to raise money for the Roman troops which were fighting in the Sertorian War (80-72 BCE) in Hispania. Pompey, one of the commanders in that war, had crossed Gaul to go to Hispania and subdued some (unspecified) rebellious tribes there. Pompey used Gallia Transalpina, which was on the road to Hispania and, therefore, his line of communications, as a base for his operations in the Iberian Peninsula. He wintered in Gaul in 75/74 BCE. Fonteius also raised corn for the Roman troops and a Gallic cavalry to support them.

The Vocontii were mentioned by Julius Caesar (note that Further Province and Hither Province stand for Gallia Transalpina and Gallia Cisalpina; the latter was in northern Italy) :

... Here (in the Alps) the Ceutrones and the Graioceli and the Caturiges, having taken possession of the higher parts, attempt to obstruct the army in their march. After having routed these in several battles, he arrives in the territories of the Vocontii in the Further Province on the seventh day from Ocelum, which is the most remote town of the Hither Province; thence he leads his army into the country of the Allobroges,...

Caesar was marching from Italy to the vicinity of Lake Geneva to confront the Helvetii.

The historian Pompeius Trogus was a Vocontian. His grandfather served in the army of Pompey in Hispania during the Sertorian War .

The Vocontii are later mentioned by Tacitus (Histories, in relation to the Revolt of Vitellius, which took place in 69 CE:

The army then proceeded by slow marches through the territory of the Allobroges and Vocontii, the very length of each day's march and the changes of encampment being made a matter of traffic by the general, who concluded disgraceful bargains to the injury of the holders of land and the magistrates of the different states, and used such menaces, that at Lucus, a municipal town of the Vocontii, he was on the point of setting fire to the place, when a present of money soothed his rage.

The administrative reforms of Diocletian (reigned 284-305) abolished the old provinces and created new, smaller ones. The number of provinces was doubled. The Roman towns built on the site of or near Vocontian settlements close to the Rhône, Vasio and Noviomagus, and those on the River Drôme, Dia Augusta and Lucius Augustii, came under the Provincia Viennensis. Segusturo, and the area in the Alpes-de-Haute-Provence department came under the Provincia Narbonensis II

Rivet gives an account of the archaeological finds in Roman towns in Vocontian territory.

Dea Auguta and Lucus Augustii were in the north, on the River Drôme. Vasio and Noviomagus were on the southwestern edge of Vocontian territory. Segusturo was in the southeast, on the River Durance.

- Dea Auguta (Die). At some point it took over control of the northern region from Lucus Augustii. It was a substantial settlement which owed its prosperity to its position on a main route from the Rhône to Italy. Its importance is shown by the fact that it had two aqueducts. One was seven km long and came from the northeast. The other was five km long and came from the southeast. It is not clear when it first became a bishopric. It is possible that Nicasius, who attended the Council of Nicaea in 325 came from Dea.
- Lucus Augustii (Luc-en-Diois). Only two inscriptions have been found, one dedicated to Mercury and the other to Dea Augusta Andarta, the dominant local deity.
- Noviomagus, which was most probably Nyons. Ptolemy attributed the town to the Tricastini. Archaeology has not yielded much, and the plan of the town is unknown. Mosaics, statues and funerary inscriptions have been found.
- Vasio (Vaison-la-Romaine). The pre-Roman settlement must have been an Oppidum. The Roman town was built on the other bank of the river. It was in Pomponius Mela's list of wealthy towns. It had a theatre capable of seating 7,000 people, several public baths and an aqueduct. It was laid out in the formal Roman way. The oldest traces of buildings, which were slightly improved in 20-30 BCE and reconstructed in fully Roman style in the Flavian period (69-96 BCE), go back to the 40-30 BCE.
- Segusturo (Sisteron). Excavations have not unearthed much. A second century funerary monument, a few fourth century graves and traces of some buildings have been found.

One finds a praetor and a senate leading the city of Vaison, assisted by praefecti sent to the surrounding districts (pagi), which were advised by local assemblies (vigintiviri). Public municipal officials and slaves supplemented this administrative system.

== Religion ==
After the 1st century AD, the Vocontii went through an intense process of Romanization and began to honour their native Gaulish deities (Albarinus, Andarta, Belisama, Alaunius, Baginus, Vasio, Allobrox, Dullovius, Vintur, Alambrima, Bormanus) along with Graeco-Roman (Minerva, Mercurius, Vulcanus, Luna, Victoria, Jupiter, Fortuna, Apollo, Neptunus, Silvanus, Cybele), Eastern Mediterranean (Isis) or Gallo-Roman ones, such as Mars Rudianus or Mars Belado. The native Matrebo ('Mothers') were latinized as Matrae or Matres. From the 2nd century AD onward, the cult of Mercurus lost its importance within the religion of the Vocontii, contrary to Mars who grew in popularity. Jupiter was worshipped as a wheel-god, depicted as imperator and associated with an eagle and a snake. Dedications to Silvanus were also widespread during this period. By the 3rd century, the number of deities had considerably declined and the pantheon was mostly Romanized, with Mars, syncretized with native gods, being the most popular deity.

From the early 1st century until the late 4th century AD, a solar cult was held near the oppidum of Le Chastellard de Lardiers, at the border between Vocontian and Albician territories. A sky-god appears to have been worshipped at the Chastellard's temple. At the temple of Lachau, situated 20km north of Lardiers, a sanctuary existed from the late 1st century BC until the 4th century AD. Weapons and miniature reproductions of farming tools like billhooks, sickles and swing ploughs were found at the site, suggesting that a deity-protector of farming was worshipped there.

== Military unit ==
A 500-strong auxiliary cavalry unit, the Ala Augusta Vocontiorum civium Romanorum, was raised among the Vocontii. The troopers were Roman citizens. From 122, after service in Germania Inferior, it served at Trimontium, a mixed cavalry and infantry fort near Newstead, Scottish Borders. The unit is known by an inscription, (RIB 2121):

Campestr(ibus) / sacrum Ael(ius) / Marcus / dec(urio) alae Aug(ustae) / Vocontio(rum) / v(otum) s(olvit) l(ibens) l(aetus) m(erito)

(To the sacred Goddesses of the Parade-Ground, Aelius Marcius, decurion¹ of the Vocontian Wing, willingly, gladly and deservedly fulfilled his vow.)

This is also attested in two military diplomas, dated 122 and 126; the former from Brigetio in Pannonia (CIL XVI, 65) and the latter from Britannia (AE 1997.1779a).
