= Apt, Vaucluse =

Apt
- Subprefecture and commune
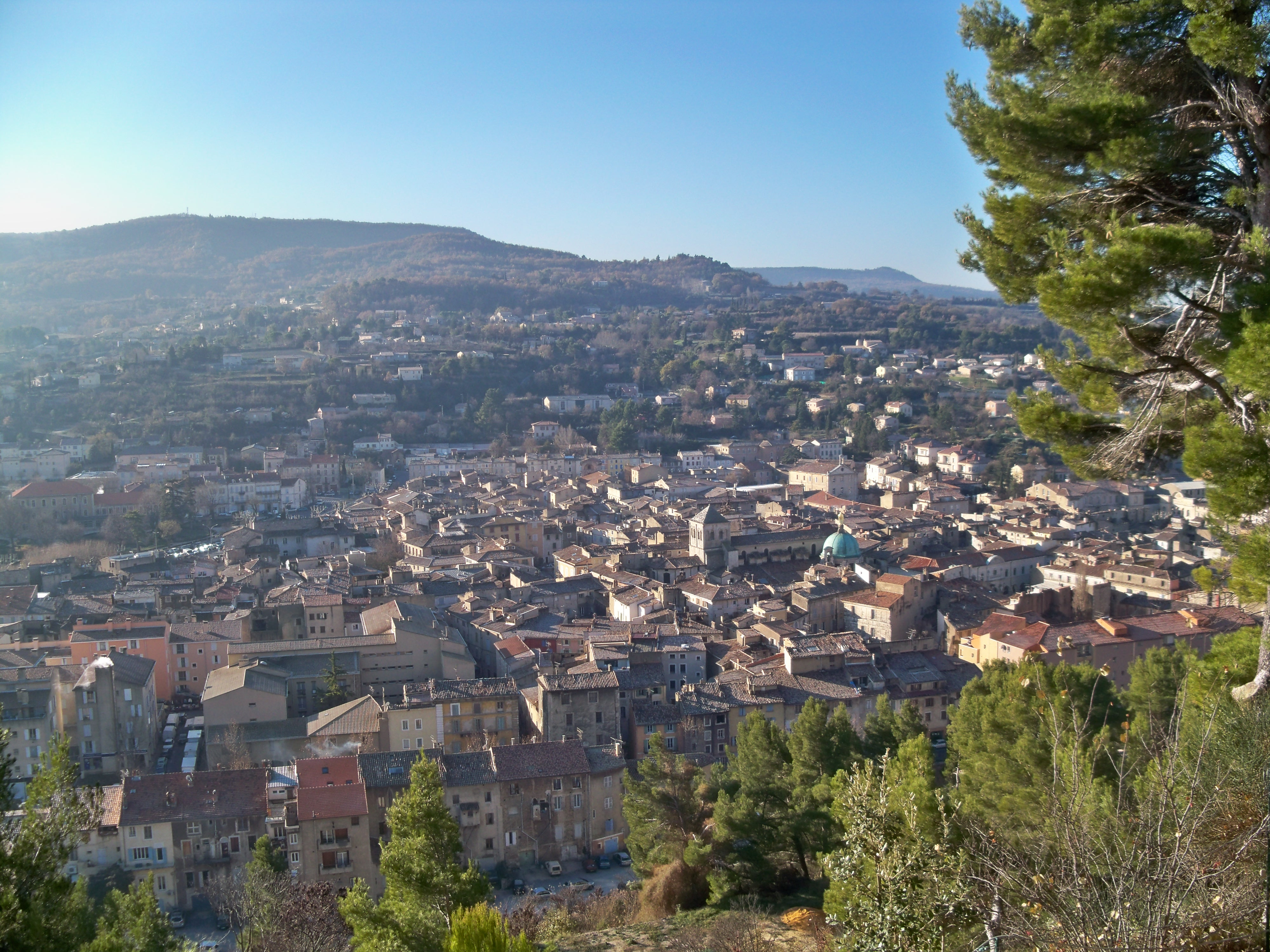
- A general view of Apt

- Coat of arms
- Location of Apt
- Location within France Location within Provence-Alpes-Côte d'Azur
- Coordinates: 43°52′37″N 5°23′49″E
- Country: France
- Region: Provence-Alpes-Côte d'Azur
- Department: Vaucluse
- Arrondissement: Apt
- Canton: Apt
- Intercommunality: Pays d'Apt-Luberon

Government
  - Mayor (2021–2026): Véronique Arnaud Deloy
- Area^{1}: 44.57 km^{2} (17.21 sq mi)
- Elevation: 253 m (830 ft)
- Highest elevation: 567 m (1,860 ft)
- Lowest elevation: 170 m (560 ft)
- Population (2023): 10,143
  - Density: 227.6/km^{2} (589.4/sq mi)
- Time zone: UTC+01:00 (CET)
  - Summer (DST): UTC+02:00 (CEST)
- INSEE/Postal code: 84003 /84400
- ^{1} French Land Register data, which excludes lakes, ponds, glaciers > 1 km^{2} (0.386 sq mi or 247 acres) and river estuaries.

Apt (French pronunciation: [apt]; Provençal Occitan: At / Ate in both classical and Mistralian norms) is a commune in the Vaucluse department in the Provence-Alpes-Côte d'Azur region in southeastern France.

It lies on the left bank of the Calavon, 41 miles (66 km) east of Avignon. It is the principal town of the Luberon mountains.

The town is known for defining the Aptian age of the Early Cretaceous.

== Geography ==
Apt lies north of Aix-en-Provence and the river Durance, in the valley of the river Calavon, (also called the Coulon), and at the foot of the north-facing slopes of the Luberon mountain.

== Climate ==
Apt has a hot-summer mediterranean climate using the Köppen climate classification, with its relatively high rainfall bordering closely on a humid subtropical climate. On average, Apt experiences 68.6 days per year with a minimum temperature below 0 °C (32.0 °F), 1.0 days per year with a minimum temperature below −10 °C (14.0 °F), 0.5 days per year with a maximum temperature below 0 °C (32.0 °F), and 57.7 days per year with a maximum temperature above 30 °C (86.0 °F). The record high temperature was 43.9 °C (111.0 °F) on June 28, 2019, while the record low temperature was −14.9 °C (5.2 °F) on February 12, 2012.

Climate data for Apt (1991–2020 normals, extremes 2007–present)
Month	Jan	Feb	Mar	Apr	May	Jun	Jul	Aug	Sep	Oct	Nov	Dec	Year
Record high °C (°F)	19.9 (67.8)	23.1 (73.6)	26.2 (79.2)	28.4 (83.1)	34.0 (93.2)	43.9 (111.0)	39.0 (102.2)	40.0 (104.0)	36.1 (97.0)	29.8 (85.6)	23.2 (73.8)	19.3 (66.7)	43.9 (111.0)
Mean daily maximum °C (°F)	10.4 (50.7)	11.9 (53.4)	15.9 (60.6)	19.8 (67.6)	23.4 (74.1)	28.2 (82.8)	31.3 (88.3)	31.0 (87.8)	26.2 (79.2)	20.7 (69.3)	14.8 (58.6)	11.1 (52.0)	20.4 (68.7)
Daily mean °C (°F)	5.2 (41.4)	5.7 (42.3)	9.1 (48.4)	12.8 (55.0)	16.3 (61.3)	20.6 (69.1)	23.1 (73.6)	22.8 (73.0)	18.8 (65.8)	14.6 (58.3)	9.6 (49.3)	5.9 (42.6)	13.7 (56.7)
Mean daily minimum °C (°F)	−0.1 (31.8)	−0.5 (31.1)	2.4 (36.3)	5.8 (42.4)	9.2 (48.6)	12.9 (55.2)	15.0 (59.0)	14.5 (58.1)	11.4 (52.5)	8.4 (47.1)	4.3 (39.7)	0.7 (33.3)	7.0 (44.6)
Record low °C (°F)	−11.5 (11.3)	−14.9 (5.2)	−6.7 (19.9)	−5.3 (22.5)	0.1 (32.2)	5.6 (42.1)	6.6 (43.9)	6.5 (43.7)	1.9 (35.4)	−3.8 (25.2)	−10.0 (14.0)	−10.1 (13.8)	−14.9 (5.2)
Average precipitation mm (inches)	57.5 (2.26)	44.4 (1.75)	49.3 (1.94)	62.1 (2.44)	67.9 (2.67)	48.3 (1.90)	21.7 (0.85)	31.6 (1.24)	60.0 (2.36)	97.2 (3.83)	117.5 (4.63)	65.4 (2.57)	722.9 (28.44)
Average precipitation days (≥ 1.0 mm)	6.4	6.0	6.4	6.6	6.8	4.9	2.4	3.4	4.5	5.7	8.0	6.5	67.6
Source: Meteociel

== Geological age ==
Apt is the etymological source of the Aptian, an age in the geologic timescale, a subdivision of the Early or Lower Cretaceous epoch or series and encompasses the time from 125.0 ± 1.0 Ma to 112.0 ± 1.0 Ma (million years ago), approximately. The original type locality is in the vicinity of Apt. The Aptian was introduced in scientific literature by French palaeontologist Alcide d'Orbigny in 1840.

== History ==
Apt was at one time the chief town of the Vulgientes, a Gallic tribe; it was destroyed by the Romans about 125 BC and restored by Julius Caesar, who conferred upon it the title Apta Julia; it was much injured by the Lombards and the Saracens, but its fortifications were rebuilt by the counts of Provence.

A traditional tale attributes the foundation of the bishopric of Apt to a saint named Auspicus, whom Pope Clement I sent and who died a martyr in 102; but the first documented evidence of its existence is in the acts of the Synod of Arles of 314, at which Apt was represented by a priest and an exorcist. Early 5th-century bishop Saint Castor of Apt is mentioned in contemporary liturgical documents and in a 419 letter of Pope Boniface I. The diocese appears in documents of the same century as a suffragan of Aix. As a result of the concordat of 15 July 1801 between Pope Pius VII and Napoleon Bonaparte, the territory of the diocese was incorporated by the bull Qui Christi Domini of 29 November of the same year mainly into the archdiocese of Avignon, with some parishes going instead to the diocese of Digne. No longer a residential bishopric, Apta (as it is called in Latin) is today listed by the Catholic Church as a titular see.

Important manuscripts were found in Apt concerning music in the 12th/13th centuries. They are known as the Apt Manuscript and the Ivrea Codex. They contain motets and mass movements, all of which are polyphonic. Nine out of fourteen Motets by Philippe de Vitry are recorded in the Ivrea Codex, a compilation of eighty-one compositions dating to 1360. It is purported to have been derived from the repertoire used in the Papal Palace at Avignon, since it is so close and offers a sampling of music from the Ars Nova movement.

=== Jewish history ===
According to documentation, Jews lived in Apt as early as the second half of the 14th century. The earliest documentation of Jews in Apt is dated back to the second half of the 13th century, describing the prohibition of meat selling by Jews to Christians. Columbia University Library owns a twelve document collection of notarial written money lending transactions between Jews and Christians in Apt. One of them describes a transaction between a local Jew called Gartus Bonafossi and a Christian named Iohannes Raymundi. A synagogue was documented as soon as 1416, and around 15 Jewish families were listed by the tax register by 1420. By then, Apt became the fourth largest Jewish community of Provence. The Jewish quarter was situated by the nowadays Place du Postel, and the community itself was mentioned in the writings of the poet Isaac Gorni.

=== Ecclesiastical history ===
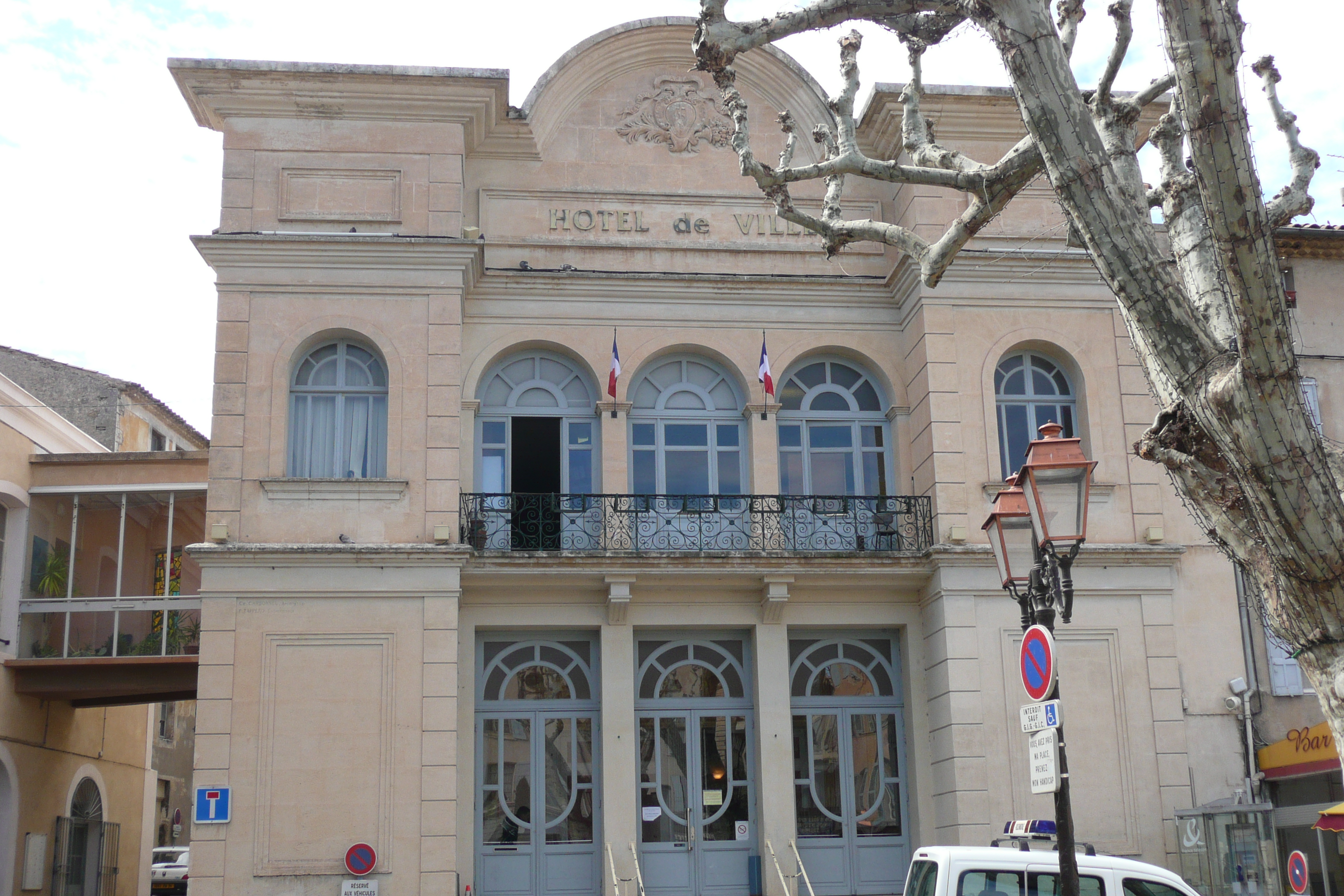
City hall

The council of Apt was held on 14 May 1365 in the cathedral of that city by the archbishops and bishops of the provinces of Arles, Embrun and Aix-en-Provence, in the south of France. Twenty-eight decrees were published and eleven days of indulgence were granted to those who would visit with pious sentiments the church of the Blessed Virgin in the Diocese of Apt on the feast of the Exaltation of the Holy Cross and venerate there certain relics of the Cross.

== Population ==
Historical population
Year	Pop.	±% p.a.
1968	9,623	—
1975	11,288	+2.31%
1982	11,496	+0.26%
1990	11,506	+0.01%
1999	11,172	−0.33%
2007	11,158	−0.02%
2012	11,979	+1.43%
2017	11,425	−0.94%
2023	10,143	−1.96%
Source: INSEE

== Sights ==
The chief object of interest is the church of Sainte-Anne (once the cathedral), the building of which was begun about the year 1056 on the site of a much older edifice, but not completed until the latter half of the 17th century.

The town was formerly surrounded by massive ancient walls, but these have now been for the most part replaced by boulevards; many of its streets are narrow and irregular.

Many Roman remains have been found in and near the town. A fine bridge, the Pont Julien, spanning the Coulon below the town, dates from 2 BC. Archeologists and others now believe that the Pont Julien dates much later than the 2nd century

== Economy ==
The region is a centre for wine, honey, truffles, and fruit, much of which is converted to crystallized fruit by both industrial and handmade processes. The headquarters of Delta Plus Group is a located in the city.

== Twin towns – sister cities ==
Apt is twinned with:

- Bakel, Senegal
- Boussu, Belgium
- Thiene, Italy

== See also ==
- Côtes du Luberon AOC
- Communes of the Vaucluse department

== Sources ==
- MANSI, Coll. Conc., XXVI, 445; MARTÈNE, Thes. nov. anecd. (1717), IV, 331-342; BOZE, Hist. de l'église d'Apt (Apt. 1820)
